

265001–265100 

|-bgcolor=#E9E9E9
| 265001 ||  || — || March 7, 2003 || Anderson Mesa || LONEOS || RAF || align=right | 1.1 km || 
|-id=002 bgcolor=#E9E9E9
| 265002 ||  || — || March 10, 2003 || Anderson Mesa || LONEOS || — || align=right | 1.3 km || 
|-id=003 bgcolor=#E9E9E9
| 265003 ||  || — || March 9, 2003 || Anderson Mesa || LONEOS || — || align=right | 1.5 km || 
|-id=004 bgcolor=#E9E9E9
| 265004 ||  || — || March 9, 2003 || Palomar || NEAT || EUN || align=right | 1.9 km || 
|-id=005 bgcolor=#fefefe
| 265005 ||  || — || March 11, 2003 || Palomar || NEAT || H || align=right data-sort-value="0.78" | 780 m || 
|-id=006 bgcolor=#E9E9E9
| 265006 ||  || — || March 10, 2003 || Palomar || NEAT || — || align=right | 1.3 km || 
|-id=007 bgcolor=#E9E9E9
| 265007 ||  || — || March 24, 2003 || Kitt Peak || Spacewatch || — || align=right | 1.7 km || 
|-id=008 bgcolor=#E9E9E9
| 265008 ||  || — || March 26, 2003 || Palomar || NEAT || EUN || align=right | 1.9 km || 
|-id=009 bgcolor=#E9E9E9
| 265009 ||  || — || March 26, 2003 || Kitt Peak || Spacewatch || MAR || align=right | 1.6 km || 
|-id=010 bgcolor=#E9E9E9
| 265010 ||  || — || March 27, 2003 || Socorro || LINEAR || — || align=right | 1.8 km || 
|-id=011 bgcolor=#E9E9E9
| 265011 ||  || — || March 29, 2003 || Anderson Mesa || LONEOS || RAF || align=right | 1.4 km || 
|-id=012 bgcolor=#E9E9E9
| 265012 ||  || — || March 24, 2003 || Kitt Peak || Spacewatch || — || align=right | 1.2 km || 
|-id=013 bgcolor=#E9E9E9
| 265013 ||  || — || March 26, 2003 || Palomar || NEAT || RAF || align=right | 1.2 km || 
|-id=014 bgcolor=#E9E9E9
| 265014 ||  || — || March 26, 2003 || Kitt Peak || Spacewatch || — || align=right | 1.6 km || 
|-id=015 bgcolor=#E9E9E9
| 265015 ||  || — || April 3, 2003 || Anderson Mesa || LONEOS || — || align=right data-sort-value="0.98" | 980 m || 
|-id=016 bgcolor=#E9E9E9
| 265016 ||  || — || April 7, 2003 || Kitt Peak || Spacewatch || — || align=right | 1.7 km || 
|-id=017 bgcolor=#E9E9E9
| 265017 ||  || — || April 5, 2003 || Kitt Peak || Spacewatch || — || align=right | 3.3 km || 
|-id=018 bgcolor=#E9E9E9
| 265018 ||  || — || April 9, 2003 || Socorro || LINEAR || — || align=right | 2.7 km || 
|-id=019 bgcolor=#E9E9E9
| 265019 ||  || — || April 23, 2003 || Campo Imperatore || CINEOS || MRX || align=right | 1.6 km || 
|-id=020 bgcolor=#E9E9E9
| 265020 ||  || — || April 24, 2003 || Haleakala || NEAT || — || align=right | 1.9 km || 
|-id=021 bgcolor=#E9E9E9
| 265021 ||  || — || April 24, 2003 || Kitt Peak || Spacewatch || — || align=right | 1.4 km || 
|-id=022 bgcolor=#E9E9E9
| 265022 ||  || — || April 26, 2003 || Kitt Peak || Spacewatch || — || align=right | 1.5 km || 
|-id=023 bgcolor=#E9E9E9
| 265023 ||  || — || April 29, 2003 || Haleakala || NEAT || EUN || align=right | 2.1 km || 
|-id=024 bgcolor=#E9E9E9
| 265024 ||  || — || April 28, 2003 || Anderson Mesa || LONEOS || — || align=right | 3.0 km || 
|-id=025 bgcolor=#E9E9E9
| 265025 ||  || — || May 8, 2003 || Socorro || LINEAR || — || align=right | 3.2 km || 
|-id=026 bgcolor=#E9E9E9
| 265026 ||  || — || June 7, 2003 || Kitt Peak || Spacewatch || — || align=right | 2.5 km || 
|-id=027 bgcolor=#E9E9E9
| 265027 ||  || — || June 23, 2003 || Socorro || LINEAR || PAL || align=right | 2.9 km || 
|-id=028 bgcolor=#d6d6d6
| 265028 ||  || — || June 24, 2003 || Campo Imperatore || CINEOS || — || align=right | 5.2 km || 
|-id=029 bgcolor=#E9E9E9
| 265029 || 2003 NK || — || July 1, 2003 || Haleakala || NEAT || — || align=right | 4.1 km || 
|-id=030 bgcolor=#d6d6d6
| 265030 ||  || — || July 3, 2003 || Socorro || LINEAR || — || align=right | 2.8 km || 
|-id=031 bgcolor=#d6d6d6
| 265031 || 2003 OT || — || July 21, 2003 || Wrightwood || J. W. Young || TIR || align=right | 2.2 km || 
|-id=032 bgcolor=#FFC2E0
| 265032 || 2003 OU || — || July 20, 2003 || Palomar || NEAT || APO +1km || align=right | 1.7 km || 
|-id=033 bgcolor=#d6d6d6
| 265033 ||  || — || July 22, 2003 || Palomar || NEAT || — || align=right | 3.3 km || 
|-id=034 bgcolor=#d6d6d6
| 265034 ||  || — || July 31, 2003 || Campo Imperatore || CINEOS || — || align=right | 4.8 km || 
|-id=035 bgcolor=#d6d6d6
| 265035 ||  || — || July 30, 2003 || Needville || W. G. Dillon, P. Garossino || — || align=right | 4.2 km || 
|-id=036 bgcolor=#d6d6d6
| 265036 ||  || — || July 24, 2003 || Palomar || NEAT || — || align=right | 4.3 km || 
|-id=037 bgcolor=#d6d6d6
| 265037 ||  || — || July 24, 2003 || Palomar || NEAT || TIR || align=right | 2.1 km || 
|-id=038 bgcolor=#fefefe
| 265038 ||  || — || July 24, 2003 || Palomar || NEAT || — || align=right data-sort-value="0.88" | 880 m || 
|-id=039 bgcolor=#d6d6d6
| 265039 ||  || — || August 1, 2003 || Haleakala || NEAT || — || align=right | 3.5 km || 
|-id=040 bgcolor=#d6d6d6
| 265040 ||  || — || August 19, 2003 || Campo Imperatore || CINEOS || — || align=right | 4.5 km || 
|-id=041 bgcolor=#d6d6d6
| 265041 ||  || — || August 20, 2003 || Campo Imperatore || CINEOS || — || align=right | 3.8 km || 
|-id=042 bgcolor=#fefefe
| 265042 ||  || — || August 22, 2003 || Haleakala || NEAT || — || align=right | 1.0 km || 
|-id=043 bgcolor=#E9E9E9
| 265043 ||  || — || August 23, 2003 || Palomar || NEAT || — || align=right | 2.4 km || 
|-id=044 bgcolor=#d6d6d6
| 265044 ||  || — || August 22, 2003 || Palomar || NEAT || — || align=right | 4.0 km || 
|-id=045 bgcolor=#fefefe
| 265045 ||  || — || August 22, 2003 || Socorro || LINEAR || — || align=right data-sort-value="0.90" | 900 m || 
|-id=046 bgcolor=#d6d6d6
| 265046 ||  || — || August 23, 2003 || Socorro || LINEAR || — || align=right | 3.6 km || 
|-id=047 bgcolor=#d6d6d6
| 265047 ||  || — || August 23, 2003 || Palomar || NEAT || — || align=right | 3.9 km || 
|-id=048 bgcolor=#d6d6d6
| 265048 ||  || — || August 24, 2003 || Socorro || LINEAR || — || align=right | 3.7 km || 
|-id=049 bgcolor=#d6d6d6
| 265049 ||  || — || August 27, 2003 || Reedy Creek || J. Broughton || — || align=right | 4.1 km || 
|-id=050 bgcolor=#d6d6d6
| 265050 ||  || — || August 31, 2003 || Socorro || LINEAR || Tj (2.95) || align=right | 7.5 km || 
|-id=051 bgcolor=#fefefe
| 265051 ||  || — || August 31, 2003 || Socorro || LINEAR || — || align=right | 3.3 km || 
|-id=052 bgcolor=#d6d6d6
| 265052 ||  || — || August 22, 2003 || Campo Imperatore || CINEOS || — || align=right | 3.8 km || 
|-id=053 bgcolor=#fefefe
| 265053 ||  || — || September 2, 2003 || Reedy Creek || J. Broughton || — || align=right | 1.4 km || 
|-id=054 bgcolor=#fefefe
| 265054 ||  || — || September 3, 2003 || Bergisch Gladbach || W. Bickel || — || align=right data-sort-value="0.76" | 760 m || 
|-id=055 bgcolor=#d6d6d6
| 265055 ||  || — || September 4, 2003 || Socorro || LINEAR || — || align=right | 5.5 km || 
|-id=056 bgcolor=#d6d6d6
| 265056 ||  || — || September 17, 2003 || Kitt Peak || Spacewatch || — || align=right | 4.2 km || 
|-id=057 bgcolor=#d6d6d6
| 265057 ||  || — || September 18, 2003 || Palomar || NEAT || — || align=right | 3.8 km || 
|-id=058 bgcolor=#fefefe
| 265058 ||  || — || September 18, 2003 || Kitt Peak || Spacewatch || — || align=right data-sort-value="0.74" | 740 m || 
|-id=059 bgcolor=#d6d6d6
| 265059 ||  || — || September 18, 2003 || Piszkéstető || K. Sárneczky, B. Sipőcz || VER || align=right | 3.4 km || 
|-id=060 bgcolor=#d6d6d6
| 265060 ||  || — || September 16, 2003 || Palomar || NEAT || — || align=right | 5.2 km || 
|-id=061 bgcolor=#fefefe
| 265061 ||  || — || September 16, 2003 || Palomar || NEAT || — || align=right data-sort-value="0.91" | 910 m || 
|-id=062 bgcolor=#d6d6d6
| 265062 ||  || — || September 17, 2003 || Palomar || NEAT || EUP || align=right | 5.1 km || 
|-id=063 bgcolor=#d6d6d6
| 265063 ||  || — || September 16, 2003 || Anderson Mesa || LONEOS || — || align=right | 5.5 km || 
|-id=064 bgcolor=#d6d6d6
| 265064 ||  || — || September 18, 2003 || Palomar || NEAT || — || align=right | 4.8 km || 
|-id=065 bgcolor=#d6d6d6
| 265065 ||  || — || September 17, 2003 || Anderson Mesa || LONEOS || EOS || align=right | 3.6 km || 
|-id=066 bgcolor=#d6d6d6
| 265066 ||  || — || September 19, 2003 || Kitt Peak || Spacewatch || — || align=right | 4.2 km || 
|-id=067 bgcolor=#d6d6d6
| 265067 ||  || — || September 18, 2003 || Kitt Peak || Spacewatch || THM || align=right | 2.9 km || 
|-id=068 bgcolor=#d6d6d6
| 265068 ||  || — || September 18, 2003 || Kitt Peak || Spacewatch || EOS || align=right | 3.2 km || 
|-id=069 bgcolor=#d6d6d6
| 265069 ||  || — || September 19, 2003 || Kitt Peak || Spacewatch || EOS || align=right | 3.1 km || 
|-id=070 bgcolor=#d6d6d6
| 265070 ||  || — || September 19, 2003 || Palomar || NEAT || — || align=right | 4.3 km || 
|-id=071 bgcolor=#d6d6d6
| 265071 ||  || — || September 20, 2003 || Palomar || NEAT || 7:4 || align=right | 3.4 km || 
|-id=072 bgcolor=#d6d6d6
| 265072 ||  || — || September 20, 2003 || Palomar || NEAT || TIR || align=right | 3.7 km || 
|-id=073 bgcolor=#d6d6d6
| 265073 ||  || — || September 19, 2003 || Kitt Peak || Spacewatch || — || align=right | 4.8 km || 
|-id=074 bgcolor=#d6d6d6
| 265074 ||  || — || September 18, 2003 || Campo Imperatore || CINEOS || HYG || align=right | 4.2 km || 
|-id=075 bgcolor=#d6d6d6
| 265075 ||  || — || September 20, 2003 || Socorro || LINEAR || — || align=right | 4.5 km || 
|-id=076 bgcolor=#d6d6d6
| 265076 ||  || — || September 19, 2003 || Anderson Mesa || LONEOS || — || align=right | 4.3 km || 
|-id=077 bgcolor=#d6d6d6
| 265077 ||  || — || September 19, 2003 || Anderson Mesa || LONEOS || EUP || align=right | 7.9 km || 
|-id=078 bgcolor=#d6d6d6
| 265078 ||  || — || September 22, 2003 || Kitt Peak || Spacewatch || — || align=right | 5.4 km || 
|-id=079 bgcolor=#d6d6d6
| 265079 ||  || — || September 19, 2003 || Kitt Peak || Spacewatch || — || align=right | 3.4 km || 
|-id=080 bgcolor=#fefefe
| 265080 ||  || — || September 23, 2003 || Uccle || T. Pauwels || — || align=right data-sort-value="0.71" | 710 m || 
|-id=081 bgcolor=#d6d6d6
| 265081 ||  || — || September 18, 2003 || Palomar || NEAT || EOS || align=right | 2.6 km || 
|-id=082 bgcolor=#d6d6d6
| 265082 ||  || — || September 19, 2003 || Socorro || LINEAR || VER || align=right | 4.8 km || 
|-id=083 bgcolor=#d6d6d6
| 265083 ||  || — || September 22, 2003 || Palomar || NEAT || — || align=right | 4.3 km || 
|-id=084 bgcolor=#d6d6d6
| 265084 ||  || — || September 18, 2003 || Palomar || NEAT || — || align=right | 4.6 km || 
|-id=085 bgcolor=#fefefe
| 265085 ||  || — || September 24, 2003 || Haleakala || NEAT || FLO || align=right data-sort-value="0.87" | 870 m || 
|-id=086 bgcolor=#d6d6d6
| 265086 ||  || — || September 25, 2003 || Kvistaberg || UDAS || — || align=right | 4.3 km || 
|-id=087 bgcolor=#d6d6d6
| 265087 ||  || — || September 25, 2003 || Palomar || NEAT || EOS || align=right | 3.5 km || 
|-id=088 bgcolor=#fefefe
| 265088 ||  || — || September 27, 2003 || Kitt Peak || Spacewatch || — || align=right data-sort-value="0.75" | 750 m || 
|-id=089 bgcolor=#d6d6d6
| 265089 ||  || — || September 28, 2003 || Socorro || LINEAR || — || align=right | 3.4 km || 
|-id=090 bgcolor=#d6d6d6
| 265090 ||  || — || September 28, 2003 || Kitt Peak || Spacewatch || EOS || align=right | 2.8 km || 
|-id=091 bgcolor=#d6d6d6
| 265091 ||  || — || September 30, 2003 || Socorro || LINEAR || — || align=right | 4.6 km || 
|-id=092 bgcolor=#d6d6d6
| 265092 ||  || — || September 30, 2003 || Socorro || LINEAR || EMA || align=right | 5.5 km || 
|-id=093 bgcolor=#d6d6d6
| 265093 ||  || — || September 21, 2003 || Palomar || NEAT || URS || align=right | 5.7 km || 
|-id=094 bgcolor=#d6d6d6
| 265094 ||  || — || September 28, 2003 || Socorro || LINEAR || TIR || align=right | 3.3 km || 
|-id=095 bgcolor=#d6d6d6
| 265095 ||  || — || September 28, 2003 || Socorro || LINEAR || — || align=right | 4.0 km || 
|-id=096 bgcolor=#d6d6d6
| 265096 ||  || — || September 28, 2003 || Anderson Mesa || LONEOS || CRO || align=right | 5.0 km || 
|-id=097 bgcolor=#fefefe
| 265097 ||  || — || September 18, 2003 || Haleakala || NEAT || — || align=right data-sort-value="0.73" | 730 m || 
|-id=098 bgcolor=#fefefe
| 265098 ||  || — || September 17, 2003 || Palomar || NEAT || — || align=right data-sort-value="0.91" | 910 m || 
|-id=099 bgcolor=#d6d6d6
| 265099 ||  || — || September 30, 2003 || Kitt Peak || Spacewatch || — || align=right | 3.4 km || 
|-id=100 bgcolor=#fefefe
| 265100 ||  || — || September 27, 2003 || Socorro || LINEAR || FLO || align=right data-sort-value="0.86" | 860 m || 
|}

265101–265200 

|-bgcolor=#fefefe
| 265101 ||  || — || September 20, 2003 || Kitt Peak || Spacewatch || — || align=right data-sort-value="0.68" | 680 m || 
|-id=102 bgcolor=#d6d6d6
| 265102 ||  || — || September 21, 2003 || Kitt Peak || Spacewatch || — || align=right | 3.2 km || 
|-id=103 bgcolor=#d6d6d6
| 265103 ||  || — || September 16, 2003 || Kitt Peak || Spacewatch || EOS || align=right | 2.3 km || 
|-id=104 bgcolor=#d6d6d6
| 265104 ||  || — || September 17, 2003 || Kitt Peak || Spacewatch || HYG || align=right | 3.3 km || 
|-id=105 bgcolor=#fefefe
| 265105 ||  || — || September 18, 2003 || Kitt Peak || Spacewatch || — || align=right data-sort-value="0.78" | 780 m || 
|-id=106 bgcolor=#d6d6d6
| 265106 ||  || — || September 19, 2003 || Kitt Peak || Spacewatch || VER || align=right | 4.1 km || 
|-id=107 bgcolor=#fefefe
| 265107 ||  || — || September 27, 2003 || Kitt Peak || Spacewatch || — || align=right data-sort-value="0.68" | 680 m || 
|-id=108 bgcolor=#fefefe
| 265108 ||  || — || September 26, 2003 || Apache Point || SDSS || — || align=right | 1.1 km || 
|-id=109 bgcolor=#d6d6d6
| 265109 ||  || — || September 20, 2003 || Palomar || NEAT || VER || align=right | 5.1 km || 
|-id=110 bgcolor=#d6d6d6
| 265110 ||  || — || September 30, 2003 || Kitt Peak || Spacewatch || VER || align=right | 5.2 km || 
|-id=111 bgcolor=#d6d6d6
| 265111 ||  || — || October 15, 2003 || Anderson Mesa || LONEOS || — || align=right | 5.8 km || 
|-id=112 bgcolor=#fefefe
| 265112 ||  || — || October 2, 2003 || Kitt Peak || Spacewatch || — || align=right data-sort-value="0.79" | 790 m || 
|-id=113 bgcolor=#d6d6d6
| 265113 ||  || — || October 2, 2003 || Kitt Peak || Spacewatch || EOS || align=right | 2.5 km || 
|-id=114 bgcolor=#fefefe
| 265114 ||  || — || October 3, 2003 || Kitt Peak || Spacewatch || — || align=right data-sort-value="0.75" | 750 m || 
|-id=115 bgcolor=#d6d6d6
| 265115 ||  || — || October 3, 2003 || Kitt Peak || Spacewatch || HYG || align=right | 3.7 km || 
|-id=116 bgcolor=#d6d6d6
| 265116 ||  || — || October 3, 2003 || Kitt Peak || Spacewatch || EOS || align=right | 2.6 km || 
|-id=117 bgcolor=#fefefe
| 265117 ||  || — || October 25, 2003 || Goodricke-Pigott || R. A. Tucker || — || align=right | 1.2 km || 
|-id=118 bgcolor=#d6d6d6
| 265118 ||  || — || October 16, 2003 || Palomar || NEAT || EOS || align=right | 2.9 km || 
|-id=119 bgcolor=#d6d6d6
| 265119 ||  || — || October 16, 2003 || Anderson Mesa || LONEOS || EOS || align=right | 3.3 km || 
|-id=120 bgcolor=#d6d6d6
| 265120 ||  || — || October 16, 2003 || Palomar || NEAT || EOS || align=right | 3.2 km || 
|-id=121 bgcolor=#fefefe
| 265121 ||  || — || October 17, 2003 || Kitt Peak || Spacewatch || — || align=right data-sort-value="0.90" | 900 m || 
|-id=122 bgcolor=#fefefe
| 265122 ||  || — || October 18, 2003 || Kitt Peak || Spacewatch || FLO || align=right data-sort-value="0.66" | 660 m || 
|-id=123 bgcolor=#d6d6d6
| 265123 ||  || — || October 18, 2003 || Palomar || NEAT || — || align=right | 4.1 km || 
|-id=124 bgcolor=#fefefe
| 265124 ||  || — || October 19, 2003 || Palomar || NEAT || — || align=right | 1.4 km || 
|-id=125 bgcolor=#fefefe
| 265125 ||  || — || October 20, 2003 || Palomar || NEAT || — || align=right | 1.2 km || 
|-id=126 bgcolor=#d6d6d6
| 265126 ||  || — || October 16, 2003 || Palomar || NEAT || VER || align=right | 3.8 km || 
|-id=127 bgcolor=#fefefe
| 265127 ||  || — || October 16, 2003 || Palomar || NEAT || FLO || align=right data-sort-value="0.70" | 700 m || 
|-id=128 bgcolor=#d6d6d6
| 265128 ||  || — || October 16, 2003 || Anderson Mesa || LONEOS || TEL || align=right | 2.6 km || 
|-id=129 bgcolor=#fefefe
| 265129 ||  || — || October 18, 2003 || Anderson Mesa || LONEOS || — || align=right | 1.3 km || 
|-id=130 bgcolor=#fefefe
| 265130 ||  || — || October 20, 2003 || Socorro || LINEAR || — || align=right data-sort-value="0.92" | 920 m || 
|-id=131 bgcolor=#d6d6d6
| 265131 ||  || — || October 21, 2003 || Palomar || NEAT || THM || align=right | 3.6 km || 
|-id=132 bgcolor=#fefefe
| 265132 ||  || — || October 21, 2003 || Palomar || NEAT || — || align=right data-sort-value="0.96" | 960 m || 
|-id=133 bgcolor=#d6d6d6
| 265133 ||  || — || October 22, 2003 || Palomar || NEAT || EOS || align=right | 3.2 km || 
|-id=134 bgcolor=#fefefe
| 265134 ||  || — || October 22, 2003 || Socorro || LINEAR || FLO || align=right data-sort-value="0.81" | 810 m || 
|-id=135 bgcolor=#fefefe
| 265135 ||  || — || October 23, 2003 || Kitt Peak || Spacewatch || — || align=right | 1.0 km || 
|-id=136 bgcolor=#d6d6d6
| 265136 ||  || — || October 21, 2003 || Socorro || LINEAR || HYG || align=right | 3.4 km || 
|-id=137 bgcolor=#d6d6d6
| 265137 ||  || — || October 22, 2003 || Kitt Peak || Spacewatch || HYG || align=right | 4.6 km || 
|-id=138 bgcolor=#fefefe
| 265138 ||  || — || October 27, 2003 || Socorro || LINEAR || — || align=right | 1.2 km || 
|-id=139 bgcolor=#FA8072
| 265139 ||  || — || October 30, 2003 || Socorro || LINEAR || — || align=right data-sort-value="0.87" | 870 m || 
|-id=140 bgcolor=#fefefe
| 265140 ||  || — || October 16, 2003 || Kitt Peak || Spacewatch || — || align=right data-sort-value="0.64" | 640 m || 
|-id=141 bgcolor=#fefefe
| 265141 ||  || — || October 17, 2003 || Kitt Peak || Spacewatch || FLO || align=right data-sort-value="0.75" | 750 m || 
|-id=142 bgcolor=#fefefe
| 265142 ||  || — || October 20, 2003 || Palomar || NEAT || — || align=right | 1.0 km || 
|-id=143 bgcolor=#d6d6d6
| 265143 ||  || — || October 20, 2003 || Palomar || NEAT || — || align=right | 5.8 km || 
|-id=144 bgcolor=#fefefe
| 265144 ||  || — || October 21, 2003 || Kitt Peak || Spacewatch || FLO || align=right data-sort-value="0.62" | 620 m || 
|-id=145 bgcolor=#d6d6d6
| 265145 ||  || — || October 18, 2003 || Kitt Peak || Spacewatch || — || align=right | 3.4 km || 
|-id=146 bgcolor=#d6d6d6
| 265146 ||  || — || October 22, 2003 || Apache Point || SDSS || EOS || align=right | 2.8 km || 
|-id=147 bgcolor=#d6d6d6
| 265147 ||  || — || November 3, 2003 || Socorro || LINEAR || TIR || align=right | 5.0 km || 
|-id=148 bgcolor=#fefefe
| 265148 ||  || — || November 14, 2003 || Palomar || NEAT || — || align=right | 1.1 km || 
|-id=149 bgcolor=#d6d6d6
| 265149 ||  || — || November 18, 2003 || Palomar || NEAT || — || align=right | 7.3 km || 
|-id=150 bgcolor=#fefefe
| 265150 ||  || — || November 19, 2003 || Kitt Peak || Spacewatch || FLO || align=right data-sort-value="0.85" | 850 m || 
|-id=151 bgcolor=#fefefe
| 265151 ||  || — || November 18, 2003 || Palomar || NEAT || — || align=right data-sort-value="0.87" | 870 m || 
|-id=152 bgcolor=#d6d6d6
| 265152 ||  || — || November 19, 2003 || Kitt Peak || Spacewatch || — || align=right | 3.6 km || 
|-id=153 bgcolor=#fefefe
| 265153 ||  || — || November 19, 2003 || Socorro || LINEAR || FLO || align=right data-sort-value="0.84" | 840 m || 
|-id=154 bgcolor=#fefefe
| 265154 ||  || — || November 18, 2003 || Palomar || NEAT || — || align=right data-sort-value="0.72" | 720 m || 
|-id=155 bgcolor=#fefefe
| 265155 ||  || — || November 20, 2003 || Socorro || LINEAR || — || align=right | 1.3 km || 
|-id=156 bgcolor=#fefefe
| 265156 ||  || — || November 19, 2003 || Palomar || NEAT || FLO || align=right data-sort-value="0.85" | 850 m || 
|-id=157 bgcolor=#fefefe
| 265157 ||  || — || November 18, 2003 || Palomar || NEAT || — || align=right data-sort-value="0.96" | 960 m || 
|-id=158 bgcolor=#d6d6d6
| 265158 ||  || — || November 19, 2003 || Kitt Peak || Spacewatch || VER || align=right | 6.7 km || 
|-id=159 bgcolor=#fefefe
| 265159 ||  || — || November 19, 2003 || Kitt Peak || Spacewatch || NYS || align=right data-sort-value="0.58" | 580 m || 
|-id=160 bgcolor=#d6d6d6
| 265160 ||  || — || November 19, 2003 || Socorro || LINEAR || VER || align=right | 4.2 km || 
|-id=161 bgcolor=#d6d6d6
| 265161 ||  || — || November 19, 2003 || Socorro || LINEAR || — || align=right | 4.7 km || 
|-id=162 bgcolor=#d6d6d6
| 265162 ||  || — || November 20, 2003 || Palomar || NEAT || — || align=right | 4.4 km || 
|-id=163 bgcolor=#fefefe
| 265163 ||  || — || November 16, 2003 || Kitt Peak || Spacewatch || — || align=right data-sort-value="0.99" | 990 m || 
|-id=164 bgcolor=#fefefe
| 265164 ||  || — || November 21, 2003 || Socorro || LINEAR || — || align=right data-sort-value="0.82" | 820 m || 
|-id=165 bgcolor=#fefefe
| 265165 ||  || — || November 21, 2003 || Socorro || LINEAR || — || align=right | 1.1 km || 
|-id=166 bgcolor=#fefefe
| 265166 ||  || — || November 21, 2003 || Socorro || LINEAR || — || align=right | 1.3 km || 
|-id=167 bgcolor=#d6d6d6
| 265167 ||  || — || November 23, 2003 || Socorro || LINEAR || — || align=right | 5.3 km || 
|-id=168 bgcolor=#d6d6d6
| 265168 ||  || — || November 23, 2003 || Socorro || LINEAR || TIR || align=right | 5.3 km || 
|-id=169 bgcolor=#fefefe
| 265169 ||  || — || November 23, 2003 || Socorro || LINEAR || — || align=right | 1.2 km || 
|-id=170 bgcolor=#fefefe
| 265170 ||  || — || November 23, 2003 || Kitt Peak || Spacewatch || — || align=right | 1.00 km || 
|-id=171 bgcolor=#fefefe
| 265171 ||  || — || November 19, 2003 || Palomar || NEAT || FLO || align=right data-sort-value="0.66" | 660 m || 
|-id=172 bgcolor=#d6d6d6
| 265172 ||  || — || November 24, 2003 || Socorro || LINEAR || — || align=right | 6.0 km || 
|-id=173 bgcolor=#fefefe
| 265173 ||  || — || December 3, 2003 || Socorro || LINEAR || — || align=right | 2.4 km || 
|-id=174 bgcolor=#fefefe
| 265174 ||  || — || December 1, 2003 || Kitt Peak || Spacewatch || FLO || align=right data-sort-value="0.61" | 610 m || 
|-id=175 bgcolor=#d6d6d6
| 265175 ||  || — || December 17, 2003 || Socorro || LINEAR || EUP || align=right | 4.7 km || 
|-id=176 bgcolor=#FA8072
| 265176 ||  || — || December 19, 2003 || Socorro || LINEAR || — || align=right | 1.2 km || 
|-id=177 bgcolor=#fefefe
| 265177 ||  || — || December 17, 2003 || Anderson Mesa || LONEOS || — || align=right data-sort-value="0.87" | 870 m || 
|-id=178 bgcolor=#fefefe
| 265178 ||  || — || December 17, 2003 || Palomar || NEAT || — || align=right | 1.0 km || 
|-id=179 bgcolor=#fefefe
| 265179 ||  || — || December 17, 2003 || Kitt Peak || Spacewatch || FLO || align=right data-sort-value="0.80" | 800 m || 
|-id=180 bgcolor=#fefefe
| 265180 ||  || — || December 19, 2003 || Kitt Peak || Spacewatch || — || align=right | 1.0 km || 
|-id=181 bgcolor=#fefefe
| 265181 ||  || — || December 19, 2003 || Kitt Peak || Spacewatch || — || align=right data-sort-value="0.97" | 970 m || 
|-id=182 bgcolor=#fefefe
| 265182 ||  || — || December 19, 2003 || Kitt Peak || Spacewatch || — || align=right | 1.0 km || 
|-id=183 bgcolor=#d6d6d6
| 265183 ||  || — || December 18, 2003 || Socorro || LINEAR || VER || align=right | 5.2 km || 
|-id=184 bgcolor=#fefefe
| 265184 ||  || — || December 18, 2003 || Socorro || LINEAR || — || align=right data-sort-value="0.85" | 850 m || 
|-id=185 bgcolor=#fefefe
| 265185 ||  || — || December 19, 2003 || Socorro || LINEAR || FLO || align=right | 1.0 km || 
|-id=186 bgcolor=#fefefe
| 265186 ||  || — || December 23, 2003 || Socorro || LINEAR || — || align=right | 1.1 km || 
|-id=187 bgcolor=#FFC2E0
| 265187 ||  || — || December 28, 2003 || Socorro || LINEAR || APO +1km || align=right data-sort-value="0.81" | 810 m || 
|-id=188 bgcolor=#fefefe
| 265188 ||  || — || January 13, 2004 || Anderson Mesa || LONEOS || — || align=right | 1.0 km || 
|-id=189 bgcolor=#fefefe
| 265189 ||  || — || January 17, 2004 || Palomar || NEAT || ERI || align=right | 1.7 km || 
|-id=190 bgcolor=#fefefe
| 265190 ||  || — || January 19, 2004 || Anderson Mesa || LONEOS || — || align=right data-sort-value="0.76" | 760 m || 
|-id=191 bgcolor=#fefefe
| 265191 ||  || — || January 19, 2004 || Kitt Peak || Spacewatch || FLO || align=right data-sort-value="0.88" | 880 m || 
|-id=192 bgcolor=#fefefe
| 265192 ||  || — || January 18, 2004 || Palomar || NEAT || — || align=right | 1.0 km || 
|-id=193 bgcolor=#fefefe
| 265193 ||  || — || January 19, 2004 || Catalina || CSS || FLO || align=right data-sort-value="0.92" | 920 m || 
|-id=194 bgcolor=#fefefe
| 265194 ||  || — || January 21, 2004 || Socorro || LINEAR || FLO || align=right data-sort-value="0.71" | 710 m || 
|-id=195 bgcolor=#fefefe
| 265195 ||  || — || January 22, 2004 || Socorro || LINEAR || — || align=right data-sort-value="0.75" | 750 m || 
|-id=196 bgcolor=#FFC2E0
| 265196 ||  || — || January 23, 2004 || Socorro || LINEAR || APOPHA || align=right data-sort-value="0.36" | 360 m || 
|-id=197 bgcolor=#fefefe
| 265197 ||  || — || January 23, 2004 || Socorro || LINEAR || FLO || align=right | 1.00 km || 
|-id=198 bgcolor=#fefefe
| 265198 ||  || — || January 22, 2004 || Socorro || LINEAR || NYS || align=right data-sort-value="0.84" | 840 m || 
|-id=199 bgcolor=#fefefe
| 265199 ||  || — || January 24, 2004 || Socorro || LINEAR || — || align=right | 1.1 km || 
|-id=200 bgcolor=#fefefe
| 265200 ||  || — || January 24, 2004 || Socorro || LINEAR || FLO || align=right | 1.0 km || 
|}

265201–265300 

|-bgcolor=#fefefe
| 265201 ||  || — || January 27, 2004 || Kitt Peak || Spacewatch || — || align=right data-sort-value="0.98" | 980 m || 
|-id=202 bgcolor=#fefefe
| 265202 ||  || — || January 30, 2004 || Socorro || LINEAR || — || align=right | 1.2 km || 
|-id=203 bgcolor=#fefefe
| 265203 ||  || — || January 24, 2004 || Socorro || LINEAR || — || align=right | 1.0 km || 
|-id=204 bgcolor=#fefefe
| 265204 ||  || — || January 28, 2004 || Catalina || CSS || FLO || align=right data-sort-value="0.98" | 980 m || 
|-id=205 bgcolor=#fefefe
| 265205 ||  || — || January 28, 2004 || Catalina || CSS || FLO || align=right data-sort-value="0.94" | 940 m || 
|-id=206 bgcolor=#fefefe
| 265206 ||  || — || January 28, 2004 || Catalina || CSS || — || align=right | 1.3 km || 
|-id=207 bgcolor=#fefefe
| 265207 ||  || — || January 28, 2004 || Socorro || LINEAR || PHO || align=right | 1.6 km || 
|-id=208 bgcolor=#fefefe
| 265208 ||  || — || January 30, 2004 || Socorro || LINEAR || NYS || align=right data-sort-value="0.92" | 920 m || 
|-id=209 bgcolor=#fefefe
| 265209 ||  || — || January 29, 2004 || Socorro || LINEAR || — || align=right | 1.6 km || 
|-id=210 bgcolor=#fefefe
| 265210 ||  || — || January 17, 2004 || Palomar || NEAT || PHO || align=right | 1.4 km || 
|-id=211 bgcolor=#fefefe
| 265211 ||  || — || January 16, 2004 || Kitt Peak || Spacewatch || — || align=right data-sort-value="0.87" | 870 m || 
|-id=212 bgcolor=#fefefe
| 265212 ||  || — || February 2, 2004 || Catalina || CSS || PHO || align=right | 1.4 km || 
|-id=213 bgcolor=#fefefe
| 265213 ||  || — || February 10, 2004 || Palomar || NEAT || NYS || align=right data-sort-value="0.62" | 620 m || 
|-id=214 bgcolor=#fefefe
| 265214 ||  || — || February 10, 2004 || Palomar || NEAT || V || align=right | 1.0 km || 
|-id=215 bgcolor=#fefefe
| 265215 ||  || — || February 11, 2004 || Anderson Mesa || LONEOS || — || align=right | 1.0 km || 
|-id=216 bgcolor=#fefefe
| 265216 ||  || — || February 11, 2004 || Palomar || NEAT || — || align=right | 1.0 km || 
|-id=217 bgcolor=#fefefe
| 265217 ||  || — || February 12, 2004 || Kitt Peak || Spacewatch || — || align=right | 1.2 km || 
|-id=218 bgcolor=#fefefe
| 265218 ||  || — || February 12, 2004 || Kitt Peak || Spacewatch || FLO || align=right | 1.0 km || 
|-id=219 bgcolor=#fefefe
| 265219 ||  || — || February 11, 2004 || Kitt Peak || Spacewatch || — || align=right data-sort-value="0.87" | 870 m || 
|-id=220 bgcolor=#fefefe
| 265220 ||  || — || February 11, 2004 || Palomar || NEAT || — || align=right | 1.2 km || 
|-id=221 bgcolor=#E9E9E9
| 265221 ||  || — || February 13, 2004 || Palomar || NEAT || — || align=right | 1.4 km || 
|-id=222 bgcolor=#fefefe
| 265222 ||  || — || February 11, 2004 || Palomar || NEAT || — || align=right data-sort-value="0.94" | 940 m || 
|-id=223 bgcolor=#fefefe
| 265223 ||  || — || February 11, 2004 || Palomar || NEAT || NYS || align=right | 1.0 km || 
|-id=224 bgcolor=#fefefe
| 265224 ||  || — || February 15, 2004 || Catalina || CSS || NYS || align=right data-sort-value="0.85" | 850 m || 
|-id=225 bgcolor=#fefefe
| 265225 ||  || — || February 13, 2004 || Palomar || NEAT || — || align=right | 1.6 km || 
|-id=226 bgcolor=#fefefe
| 265226 ||  || — || February 11, 2004 || Palomar || NEAT || FLO || align=right data-sort-value="0.85" | 850 m || 
|-id=227 bgcolor=#fefefe
| 265227 ||  || — || February 11, 2004 || Palomar || NEAT || V || align=right data-sort-value="0.83" | 830 m || 
|-id=228 bgcolor=#fefefe
| 265228 ||  || — || February 14, 2004 || Kitt Peak || Spacewatch || NYS || align=right data-sort-value="0.60" | 600 m || 
|-id=229 bgcolor=#fefefe
| 265229 ||  || — || February 17, 2004 || Desert Eagle || W. K. Y. Yeung || — || align=right | 1.2 km || 
|-id=230 bgcolor=#fefefe
| 265230 ||  || — || February 17, 2004 || Socorro || LINEAR || — || align=right | 1.5 km || 
|-id=231 bgcolor=#fefefe
| 265231 ||  || — || February 18, 2004 || Haleakala || NEAT || — || align=right | 1.1 km || 
|-id=232 bgcolor=#fefefe
| 265232 ||  || — || February 17, 2004 || Catalina || CSS || — || align=right | 1.4 km || 
|-id=233 bgcolor=#fefefe
| 265233 ||  || — || February 20, 2004 || Socorro || LINEAR || — || align=right | 2.3 km || 
|-id=234 bgcolor=#fefefe
| 265234 ||  || — || February 16, 2004 || Socorro || LINEAR || — || align=right data-sort-value="0.92" | 920 m || 
|-id=235 bgcolor=#fefefe
| 265235 ||  || — || February 16, 2004 || Kitt Peak || Spacewatch || — || align=right | 1.4 km || 
|-id=236 bgcolor=#fefefe
| 265236 ||  || — || February 19, 2004 || Socorro || LINEAR || — || align=right data-sort-value="0.97" | 970 m || 
|-id=237 bgcolor=#fefefe
| 265237 ||  || — || February 23, 2004 || Socorro || LINEAR || — || align=right | 1.0 km || 
|-id=238 bgcolor=#E9E9E9
| 265238 ||  || — || February 23, 2004 || Socorro || LINEAR || BRU || align=right | 2.1 km || 
|-id=239 bgcolor=#fefefe
| 265239 ||  || — || February 27, 2004 || Socorro || LINEAR || — || align=right | 2.5 km || 
|-id=240 bgcolor=#fefefe
| 265240 ||  || — || March 11, 2004 || Palomar || NEAT || NYS || align=right data-sort-value="0.69" | 690 m || 
|-id=241 bgcolor=#fefefe
| 265241 ||  || — || March 12, 2004 || Palomar || NEAT || NYS || align=right data-sort-value="0.90" | 900 m || 
|-id=242 bgcolor=#fefefe
| 265242 ||  || — || March 15, 2004 || Kitt Peak || Spacewatch || — || align=right data-sort-value="0.99" | 990 m || 
|-id=243 bgcolor=#fefefe
| 265243 ||  || — || March 15, 2004 || Catalina || CSS || NYS || align=right data-sort-value="0.84" | 840 m || 
|-id=244 bgcolor=#fefefe
| 265244 ||  || — || March 15, 2004 || Socorro || LINEAR || MAS || align=right data-sort-value="0.97" | 970 m || 
|-id=245 bgcolor=#fefefe
| 265245 ||  || — || March 15, 2004 || Kitt Peak || Spacewatch || NYS || align=right data-sort-value="0.72" | 720 m || 
|-id=246 bgcolor=#fefefe
| 265246 ||  || — || March 13, 2004 || Palomar || NEAT || NYS || align=right data-sort-value="0.91" | 910 m || 
|-id=247 bgcolor=#fefefe
| 265247 ||  || — || March 14, 2004 || Kitt Peak || Spacewatch || V || align=right | 1.0 km || 
|-id=248 bgcolor=#fefefe
| 265248 ||  || — || March 15, 2004 || Kitt Peak || Spacewatch || — || align=right data-sort-value="0.89" | 890 m || 
|-id=249 bgcolor=#fefefe
| 265249 ||  || — || March 15, 2004 || Kitt Peak || Spacewatch || FLO || align=right data-sort-value="0.91" | 910 m || 
|-id=250 bgcolor=#fefefe
| 265250 ||  || — || March 15, 2004 || Catalina || CSS || NYS || align=right | 1.1 km || 
|-id=251 bgcolor=#fefefe
| 265251 ||  || — || March 15, 2004 || Socorro || LINEAR || V || align=right data-sort-value="0.84" | 840 m || 
|-id=252 bgcolor=#fefefe
| 265252 ||  || — || March 15, 2004 || Kitt Peak || Spacewatch || NYS || align=right data-sort-value="0.72" | 720 m || 
|-id=253 bgcolor=#fefefe
| 265253 ||  || — || March 14, 2004 || Kitt Peak || Spacewatch || NYS || align=right | 1.00 km || 
|-id=254 bgcolor=#fefefe
| 265254 ||  || — || March 14, 2004 || Catalina || CSS || — || align=right | 1.3 km || 
|-id=255 bgcolor=#fefefe
| 265255 ||  || — || March 15, 2004 || Kitt Peak || Spacewatch || — || align=right | 1.0 km || 
|-id=256 bgcolor=#fefefe
| 265256 ||  || — || March 13, 2004 || Palomar || NEAT || FLO || align=right | 1.2 km || 
|-id=257 bgcolor=#d6d6d6
| 265257 ||  || — || March 15, 2004 || Palomar || NEAT || — || align=right | 8.2 km || 
|-id=258 bgcolor=#fefefe
| 265258 ||  || — || March 15, 2004 || Catalina || CSS || — || align=right data-sort-value="0.98" | 980 m || 
|-id=259 bgcolor=#fefefe
| 265259 ||  || — || March 13, 2004 || Palomar || NEAT || ERI || align=right | 3.2 km || 
|-id=260 bgcolor=#fefefe
| 265260 ||  || — || March 14, 2004 || Kitt Peak || Spacewatch || NYS || align=right data-sort-value="0.84" | 840 m || 
|-id=261 bgcolor=#fefefe
| 265261 ||  || — || March 15, 2004 || Catalina || CSS || MAS || align=right data-sort-value="0.91" | 910 m || 
|-id=262 bgcolor=#fefefe
| 265262 ||  || — || March 15, 2004 || Kitt Peak || Spacewatch || CLA || align=right | 2.0 km || 
|-id=263 bgcolor=#fefefe
| 265263 ||  || — || March 19, 2004 || Palomar || NEAT || — || align=right | 1.2 km || 
|-id=264 bgcolor=#fefefe
| 265264 ||  || — || March 16, 2004 || Kitt Peak || Spacewatch || NYS || align=right data-sort-value="0.79" | 790 m || 
|-id=265 bgcolor=#fefefe
| 265265 ||  || — || March 16, 2004 || Kitt Peak || Spacewatch || — || align=right data-sort-value="0.85" | 850 m || 
|-id=266 bgcolor=#fefefe
| 265266 ||  || — || March 17, 2004 || Kitt Peak || Spacewatch || — || align=right | 1.2 km || 
|-id=267 bgcolor=#fefefe
| 265267 ||  || — || March 17, 2004 || Socorro || LINEAR || — || align=right | 1.3 km || 
|-id=268 bgcolor=#d6d6d6
| 265268 ||  || — || March 17, 2004 || Kitt Peak || Spacewatch || 3:2 || align=right | 4.5 km || 
|-id=269 bgcolor=#fefefe
| 265269 ||  || — || March 16, 2004 || Socorro || LINEAR || NYS || align=right data-sort-value="0.83" | 830 m || 
|-id=270 bgcolor=#fefefe
| 265270 ||  || — || March 17, 2004 || Kitt Peak || Spacewatch || MAS || align=right data-sort-value="0.93" | 930 m || 
|-id=271 bgcolor=#fefefe
| 265271 ||  || — || March 17, 2004 || Socorro || LINEAR || V || align=right | 1.1 km || 
|-id=272 bgcolor=#fefefe
| 265272 ||  || — || March 18, 2004 || Socorro || LINEAR || — || align=right | 1.1 km || 
|-id=273 bgcolor=#fefefe
| 265273 ||  || — || March 18, 2004 || Kitt Peak || Spacewatch || NYS || align=right | 1.1 km || 
|-id=274 bgcolor=#fefefe
| 265274 ||  || — || March 16, 2004 || Socorro || LINEAR || NYS || align=right | 1.0 km || 
|-id=275 bgcolor=#fefefe
| 265275 ||  || — || March 18, 2004 || Socorro || LINEAR || — || align=right data-sort-value="0.87" | 870 m || 
|-id=276 bgcolor=#fefefe
| 265276 ||  || — || March 18, 2004 || Socorro || LINEAR || NYS || align=right data-sort-value="0.77" | 770 m || 
|-id=277 bgcolor=#fefefe
| 265277 ||  || — || March 19, 2004 || Socorro || LINEAR || — || align=right | 1.2 km || 
|-id=278 bgcolor=#fefefe
| 265278 ||  || — || March 16, 2004 || Kitt Peak || Spacewatch || NYS || align=right data-sort-value="0.79" | 790 m || 
|-id=279 bgcolor=#fefefe
| 265279 ||  || — || March 16, 2004 || Kitt Peak || Spacewatch || NYS || align=right data-sort-value="0.69" | 690 m || 
|-id=280 bgcolor=#fefefe
| 265280 ||  || — || March 16, 2004 || Socorro || LINEAR || — || align=right | 1.4 km || 
|-id=281 bgcolor=#fefefe
| 265281 ||  || — || March 17, 2004 || Socorro || LINEAR || — || align=right | 1.5 km || 
|-id=282 bgcolor=#fefefe
| 265282 ||  || — || March 22, 2004 || Socorro || LINEAR || — || align=right | 1.2 km || 
|-id=283 bgcolor=#fefefe
| 265283 ||  || — || March 27, 2004 || Socorro || LINEAR || NYS || align=right data-sort-value="0.74" | 740 m || 
|-id=284 bgcolor=#fefefe
| 265284 ||  || — || March 27, 2004 || Socorro || LINEAR || — || align=right data-sort-value="0.98" | 980 m || 
|-id=285 bgcolor=#fefefe
| 265285 ||  || — || March 26, 2004 || Anderson Mesa || LONEOS || V || align=right | 1.1 km || 
|-id=286 bgcolor=#fefefe
| 265286 ||  || — || March 28, 2004 || Socorro || LINEAR || — || align=right | 1.4 km || 
|-id=287 bgcolor=#fefefe
| 265287 ||  || — || March 30, 2004 || Kitt Peak || Spacewatch || — || align=right | 1.1 km || 
|-id=288 bgcolor=#fefefe
| 265288 ||  || — || April 11, 2004 || Palomar || NEAT || NYS || align=right data-sort-value="0.67" | 670 m || 
|-id=289 bgcolor=#fefefe
| 265289 ||  || — || April 15, 2004 || Anderson Mesa || LONEOS || NYS || align=right data-sort-value="0.90" | 900 m || 
|-id=290 bgcolor=#fefefe
| 265290 ||  || — || April 12, 2004 || Palomar || NEAT || NYS || align=right data-sort-value="0.83" | 830 m || 
|-id=291 bgcolor=#E9E9E9
| 265291 ||  || — || April 14, 2004 || Anderson Mesa || LONEOS || — || align=right | 4.6 km || 
|-id=292 bgcolor=#E9E9E9
| 265292 ||  || — || April 14, 2004 || Anderson Mesa || LONEOS || — || align=right | 1.5 km || 
|-id=293 bgcolor=#fefefe
| 265293 ||  || — || April 15, 2004 || Catalina || CSS || — || align=right | 1.3 km || 
|-id=294 bgcolor=#C2FFFF
| 265294 ||  || — || April 13, 2004 || Kitt Peak || Spacewatch || L4 || align=right | 11 km || 
|-id=295 bgcolor=#fefefe
| 265295 ||  || — || April 13, 2004 || Kitt Peak || Spacewatch || NYS || align=right data-sort-value="0.82" | 820 m || 
|-id=296 bgcolor=#fefefe
| 265296 ||  || — || April 14, 2004 || Kitt Peak || Spacewatch || MAS || align=right data-sort-value="0.90" | 900 m || 
|-id=297 bgcolor=#fefefe
| 265297 ||  || — || April 12, 2004 || Anderson Mesa || LONEOS || NYS || align=right data-sort-value="0.89" | 890 m || 
|-id=298 bgcolor=#fefefe
| 265298 ||  || — || April 12, 2004 || Palomar || NEAT || NYS || align=right | 1.0 km || 
|-id=299 bgcolor=#fefefe
| 265299 ||  || — || April 14, 2004 || Anderson Mesa || LONEOS || V || align=right | 1.0 km || 
|-id=300 bgcolor=#fefefe
| 265300 ||  || — || April 12, 2004 || Anderson Mesa || LONEOS || — || align=right data-sort-value="0.85" | 850 m || 
|}

265301–265400 

|-bgcolor=#fefefe
| 265301 ||  || — || April 15, 2004 || Socorro || LINEAR || — || align=right data-sort-value="0.94" | 940 m || 
|-id=302 bgcolor=#fefefe
| 265302 ||  || — || April 16, 2004 || Socorro || LINEAR || — || align=right | 1.4 km || 
|-id=303 bgcolor=#fefefe
| 265303 ||  || — || April 19, 2004 || Socorro || LINEAR || NYS || align=right data-sort-value="0.80" | 800 m || 
|-id=304 bgcolor=#fefefe
| 265304 ||  || — || April 19, 2004 || Socorro || LINEAR || — || align=right | 1.4 km || 
|-id=305 bgcolor=#fefefe
| 265305 ||  || — || April 20, 2004 || Socorro || LINEAR || — || align=right | 1.3 km || 
|-id=306 bgcolor=#fefefe
| 265306 ||  || — || April 21, 2004 || Socorro || LINEAR || — || align=right | 1.5 km || 
|-id=307 bgcolor=#fefefe
| 265307 ||  || — || April 21, 2004 || Socorro || LINEAR || V || align=right | 1.1 km || 
|-id=308 bgcolor=#fefefe
| 265308 ||  || — || April 22, 2004 || Kitt Peak || Spacewatch || SUL || align=right | 2.4 km || 
|-id=309 bgcolor=#fefefe
| 265309 ||  || — || May 13, 2004 || Kitt Peak || Spacewatch || — || align=right data-sort-value="0.89" | 890 m || 
|-id=310 bgcolor=#fefefe
| 265310 ||  || — || May 9, 2004 || Kitt Peak || Spacewatch || MAS || align=right | 1.2 km || 
|-id=311 bgcolor=#fefefe
| 265311 ||  || — || May 12, 2004 || Anderson Mesa || LONEOS || NYS || align=right data-sort-value="0.82" | 820 m || 
|-id=312 bgcolor=#fefefe
| 265312 ||  || — || May 12, 2004 || Anderson Mesa || LONEOS || — || align=right | 1.4 km || 
|-id=313 bgcolor=#fefefe
| 265313 ||  || — || May 19, 2004 || Kitt Peak || Spacewatch || — || align=right | 1.4 km || 
|-id=314 bgcolor=#fefefe
| 265314 ||  || — || May 19, 2004 || Kitt Peak || Spacewatch || — || align=right | 1.2 km || 
|-id=315 bgcolor=#fefefe
| 265315 ||  || — || July 9, 2004 || Palomar || NEAT || PHO || align=right | 2.0 km || 
|-id=316 bgcolor=#E9E9E9
| 265316 ||  || — || July 9, 2004 || Palomar || NEAT || PAE || align=right | 4.2 km || 
|-id=317 bgcolor=#E9E9E9
| 265317 ||  || — || July 11, 2004 || Socorro || LINEAR || — || align=right | 3.1 km || 
|-id=318 bgcolor=#E9E9E9
| 265318 ||  || — || July 11, 2004 || Socorro || LINEAR || — || align=right | 3.5 km || 
|-id=319 bgcolor=#E9E9E9
| 265319 ||  || — || July 14, 2004 || Reedy Creek || J. Broughton || — || align=right | 2.4 km || 
|-id=320 bgcolor=#E9E9E9
| 265320 ||  || — || July 11, 2004 || Socorro || LINEAR || — || align=right | 2.1 km || 
|-id=321 bgcolor=#E9E9E9
| 265321 ||  || — || July 11, 2004 || Socorro || LINEAR || — || align=right | 2.9 km || 
|-id=322 bgcolor=#E9E9E9
| 265322 ||  || — || July 11, 2004 || Socorro || LINEAR || AER || align=right | 2.0 km || 
|-id=323 bgcolor=#E9E9E9
| 265323 ||  || — || July 11, 2004 || Socorro || LINEAR || — || align=right | 3.5 km || 
|-id=324 bgcolor=#E9E9E9
| 265324 ||  || — || July 14, 2004 || Socorro || LINEAR || — || align=right | 2.5 km || 
|-id=325 bgcolor=#E9E9E9
| 265325 ||  || — || July 15, 2004 || Socorro || LINEAR || — || align=right | 3.0 km || 
|-id=326 bgcolor=#d6d6d6
| 265326 ||  || — || July 14, 2004 || Socorro || LINEAR || — || align=right | 4.1 km || 
|-id=327 bgcolor=#E9E9E9
| 265327 || 2004 OS || — || July 17, 2004 || 7300 Observatory || W. K. Y. Yeung || 526 || align=right | 2.8 km || 
|-id=328 bgcolor=#E9E9E9
| 265328 ||  || — || July 16, 2004 || Socorro || LINEAR || — || align=right | 1.5 km || 
|-id=329 bgcolor=#E9E9E9
| 265329 ||  || — || August 6, 2004 || Campo Imperatore || CINEOS || — || align=right | 1.3 km || 
|-id=330 bgcolor=#d6d6d6
| 265330 ||  || — || August 7, 2004 || Palomar || NEAT || — || align=right | 3.2 km || 
|-id=331 bgcolor=#E9E9E9
| 265331 ||  || — || August 7, 2004 || Palomar || NEAT || PAE || align=right | 2.6 km || 
|-id=332 bgcolor=#E9E9E9
| 265332 ||  || — || August 8, 2004 || Socorro || LINEAR || — || align=right | 4.1 km || 
|-id=333 bgcolor=#E9E9E9
| 265333 ||  || — || August 9, 2004 || Anderson Mesa || LONEOS || — || align=right | 1.9 km || 
|-id=334 bgcolor=#fefefe
| 265334 ||  || — || August 9, 2004 || Anderson Mesa || LONEOS || H || align=right data-sort-value="0.83" | 830 m || 
|-id=335 bgcolor=#E9E9E9
| 265335 ||  || — || August 9, 2004 || Socorro || LINEAR || — || align=right | 3.8 km || 
|-id=336 bgcolor=#d6d6d6
| 265336 ||  || — || August 6, 2004 || Palomar || NEAT || — || align=right | 3.2 km || 
|-id=337 bgcolor=#E9E9E9
| 265337 ||  || — || August 8, 2004 || Socorro || LINEAR || — || align=right | 3.2 km || 
|-id=338 bgcolor=#E9E9E9
| 265338 ||  || — || August 9, 2004 || Socorro || LINEAR || MAR || align=right | 1.6 km || 
|-id=339 bgcolor=#E9E9E9
| 265339 ||  || — || August 10, 2004 || Socorro || LINEAR || — || align=right | 3.1 km || 
|-id=340 bgcolor=#E9E9E9
| 265340 ||  || — || August 8, 2004 || Socorro || LINEAR || — || align=right | 3.1 km || 
|-id=341 bgcolor=#E9E9E9
| 265341 ||  || — || August 8, 2004 || Palomar || NEAT || — || align=right | 2.0 km || 
|-id=342 bgcolor=#E9E9E9
| 265342 ||  || — || August 19, 2004 || Socorro || LINEAR || — || align=right | 3.3 km || 
|-id=343 bgcolor=#E9E9E9
| 265343 ||  || — || August 21, 2004 || Siding Spring || SSS || — || align=right | 3.9 km || 
|-id=344 bgcolor=#E9E9E9
| 265344 ||  || — || September 4, 2004 || Palomar || NEAT || — || align=right | 3.6 km || 
|-id=345 bgcolor=#E9E9E9
| 265345 ||  || — || September 7, 2004 || Kitt Peak || Spacewatch || — || align=right | 2.6 km || 
|-id=346 bgcolor=#E9E9E9
| 265346 ||  || — || September 6, 2004 || Siding Spring || SSS || — || align=right | 1.7 km || 
|-id=347 bgcolor=#E9E9E9
| 265347 ||  || — || September 7, 2004 || Palomar || NEAT || — || align=right | 2.5 km || 
|-id=348 bgcolor=#E9E9E9
| 265348 ||  || — || September 8, 2004 || Socorro || LINEAR || — || align=right | 2.2 km || 
|-id=349 bgcolor=#E9E9E9
| 265349 ||  || — || September 8, 2004 || Socorro || LINEAR || AGN || align=right | 1.9 km || 
|-id=350 bgcolor=#E9E9E9
| 265350 ||  || — || September 8, 2004 || Socorro || LINEAR || — || align=right | 2.8 km || 
|-id=351 bgcolor=#E9E9E9
| 265351 ||  || — || September 8, 2004 || Socorro || LINEAR || MAR || align=right | 1.9 km || 
|-id=352 bgcolor=#d6d6d6
| 265352 ||  || — || September 8, 2004 || Socorro || LINEAR || — || align=right | 3.9 km || 
|-id=353 bgcolor=#d6d6d6
| 265353 ||  || — || September 8, 2004 || Socorro || LINEAR || LAU || align=right | 1.5 km || 
|-id=354 bgcolor=#E9E9E9
| 265354 ||  || — || September 8, 2004 || Socorro || LINEAR || VIB || align=right | 2.4 km || 
|-id=355 bgcolor=#E9E9E9
| 265355 ||  || — || September 9, 2004 || Socorro || LINEAR || — || align=right | 2.8 km || 
|-id=356 bgcolor=#E9E9E9
| 265356 ||  || — || September 7, 2004 || Socorro || LINEAR || — || align=right | 2.8 km || 
|-id=357 bgcolor=#E9E9E9
| 265357 ||  || — || September 8, 2004 || Socorro || LINEAR || — || align=right | 4.0 km || 
|-id=358 bgcolor=#d6d6d6
| 265358 ||  || — || September 8, 2004 || Socorro || LINEAR || — || align=right | 3.0 km || 
|-id=359 bgcolor=#E9E9E9
| 265359 ||  || — || September 8, 2004 || Socorro || LINEAR || GEF || align=right | 1.6 km || 
|-id=360 bgcolor=#E9E9E9
| 265360 ||  || — || September 8, 2004 || Socorro || LINEAR || NEM || align=right | 3.3 km || 
|-id=361 bgcolor=#d6d6d6
| 265361 ||  || — || September 6, 2004 || Socorro || LINEAR || ALA || align=right | 3.9 km || 
|-id=362 bgcolor=#d6d6d6
| 265362 ||  || — || September 7, 2004 || Palomar || NEAT || — || align=right | 2.8 km || 
|-id=363 bgcolor=#E9E9E9
| 265363 ||  || — || September 7, 2004 || Kitt Peak || Spacewatch || — || align=right | 2.4 km || 
|-id=364 bgcolor=#d6d6d6
| 265364 ||  || — || September 7, 2004 || Kitt Peak || Spacewatch || KOR || align=right | 1.6 km || 
|-id=365 bgcolor=#d6d6d6
| 265365 ||  || — || September 9, 2004 || Socorro || LINEAR || Tj (2.89) || align=right | 5.6 km || 
|-id=366 bgcolor=#d6d6d6
| 265366 ||  || — || September 10, 2004 || Socorro || LINEAR || VER || align=right | 4.4 km || 
|-id=367 bgcolor=#E9E9E9
| 265367 ||  || — || September 10, 2004 || Socorro || LINEAR || — || align=right | 3.4 km || 
|-id=368 bgcolor=#E9E9E9
| 265368 ||  || — || September 10, 2004 || Socorro || LINEAR || — || align=right | 3.6 km || 
|-id=369 bgcolor=#E9E9E9
| 265369 ||  || — || September 10, 2004 || Socorro || LINEAR || MRX || align=right | 1.8 km || 
|-id=370 bgcolor=#d6d6d6
| 265370 ||  || — || September 10, 2004 || Socorro || LINEAR || — || align=right | 3.4 km || 
|-id=371 bgcolor=#d6d6d6
| 265371 ||  || — || September 10, 2004 || Socorro || LINEAR || EOS || align=right | 2.8 km || 
|-id=372 bgcolor=#E9E9E9
| 265372 ||  || — || September 11, 2004 || Socorro || LINEAR || — || align=right | 3.5 km || 
|-id=373 bgcolor=#E9E9E9
| 265373 ||  || — || September 11, 2004 || Socorro || LINEAR || — || align=right | 4.4 km || 
|-id=374 bgcolor=#fefefe
| 265374 ||  || — || September 8, 2004 || Palomar || NEAT || H || align=right | 1.1 km || 
|-id=375 bgcolor=#d6d6d6
| 265375 ||  || — || September 9, 2004 || Socorro || LINEAR || KOR || align=right | 2.2 km || 
|-id=376 bgcolor=#E9E9E9
| 265376 ||  || — || September 9, 2004 || Kitt Peak || Spacewatch || EUN || align=right | 1.9 km || 
|-id=377 bgcolor=#E9E9E9
| 265377 ||  || — || September 10, 2004 || Kitt Peak || Spacewatch || — || align=right | 1.9 km || 
|-id=378 bgcolor=#fefefe
| 265378 ||  || — || September 12, 2004 || Socorro || LINEAR || H || align=right data-sort-value="0.73" | 730 m || 
|-id=379 bgcolor=#fefefe
| 265379 ||  || — || September 12, 2004 || Socorro || LINEAR || H || align=right data-sort-value="0.71" | 710 m || 
|-id=380 bgcolor=#E9E9E9
| 265380 Terzan ||  ||  || September 15, 2004 || Mauna Kea || J. Pittichová, J. Bedient || — || align=right | 2.2 km || 
|-id=381 bgcolor=#E9E9E9
| 265381 ||  || — || September 11, 2004 || Kitt Peak || Spacewatch || HEN || align=right | 1.2 km || 
|-id=382 bgcolor=#E9E9E9
| 265382 ||  || — || September 11, 2004 || Kitt Peak || Spacewatch || AGN || align=right | 1.4 km || 
|-id=383 bgcolor=#d6d6d6
| 265383 ||  || — || September 10, 2004 || Socorro || LINEAR || 628 || align=right | 2.5 km || 
|-id=384 bgcolor=#d6d6d6
| 265384 ||  || — || September 11, 2004 || Kitt Peak || Spacewatch || K-2 || align=right | 1.4 km || 
|-id=385 bgcolor=#E9E9E9
| 265385 ||  || — || September 11, 2004 || Kitt Peak || Spacewatch || — || align=right | 2.8 km || 
|-id=386 bgcolor=#d6d6d6
| 265386 ||  || — || September 11, 2004 || Kitt Peak || Spacewatch || KOR || align=right | 1.4 km || 
|-id=387 bgcolor=#d6d6d6
| 265387 ||  || — || September 13, 2004 || Socorro || LINEAR || — || align=right | 4.6 km || 
|-id=388 bgcolor=#d6d6d6
| 265388 ||  || — || September 13, 2004 || Socorro || LINEAR || — || align=right | 2.6 km || 
|-id=389 bgcolor=#E9E9E9
| 265389 ||  || — || September 8, 2004 || Socorro || LINEAR || — || align=right | 3.6 km || 
|-id=390 bgcolor=#d6d6d6
| 265390 ||  || — || September 17, 2004 || Socorro || LINEAR || — || align=right | 3.5 km || 
|-id=391 bgcolor=#E9E9E9
| 265391 ||  || — || September 16, 2004 || Kitt Peak || Spacewatch || GEF || align=right | 1.9 km || 
|-id=392 bgcolor=#d6d6d6
| 265392 ||  || — || September 17, 2004 || Socorro || LINEAR || — || align=right | 3.0 km || 
|-id=393 bgcolor=#E9E9E9
| 265393 ||  || — || September 18, 2004 || Socorro || LINEAR || CLO || align=right | 3.0 km || 
|-id=394 bgcolor=#E9E9E9
| 265394 ||  || — || September 16, 2004 || Anderson Mesa || LONEOS || NEM || align=right | 3.6 km || 
|-id=395 bgcolor=#d6d6d6
| 265395 ||  || — || October 4, 2004 || Kitt Peak || Spacewatch || — || align=right | 2.7 km || 
|-id=396 bgcolor=#d6d6d6
| 265396 ||  || — || October 9, 2004 || Kitt Peak || Spacewatch || — || align=right | 3.2 km || 
|-id=397 bgcolor=#fefefe
| 265397 ||  || — || October 11, 2004 || Palomar || NEAT || H || align=right data-sort-value="0.71" | 710 m || 
|-id=398 bgcolor=#d6d6d6
| 265398 ||  || — || October 14, 2004 || Goodricke-Pigott || R. A. Tucker || — || align=right | 3.4 km || 
|-id=399 bgcolor=#d6d6d6
| 265399 ||  || — || October 15, 2004 || Socorro || LINEAR || EUP || align=right | 3.9 km || 
|-id=400 bgcolor=#E9E9E9
| 265400 ||  || — || October 4, 2004 || Kitt Peak || Spacewatch || AST || align=right | 3.1 km || 
|}

265401–265500 

|-bgcolor=#d6d6d6
| 265401 ||  || — || October 4, 2004 || Kitt Peak || Spacewatch || KAR || align=right | 1.2 km || 
|-id=402 bgcolor=#d6d6d6
| 265402 ||  || — || October 4, 2004 || Kitt Peak || Spacewatch || — || align=right | 2.8 km || 
|-id=403 bgcolor=#d6d6d6
| 265403 ||  || — || October 5, 2004 || Kitt Peak || Spacewatch || KOR || align=right | 1.5 km || 
|-id=404 bgcolor=#d6d6d6
| 265404 ||  || — || October 5, 2004 || Kitt Peak || Spacewatch || — || align=right | 2.4 km || 
|-id=405 bgcolor=#d6d6d6
| 265405 ||  || — || October 7, 2004 || Anderson Mesa || LONEOS || — || align=right | 3.3 km || 
|-id=406 bgcolor=#d6d6d6
| 265406 ||  || — || October 7, 2004 || Kitt Peak || Spacewatch || CHA || align=right | 2.4 km || 
|-id=407 bgcolor=#d6d6d6
| 265407 ||  || — || October 4, 2004 || Kitt Peak || Spacewatch || EOS || align=right | 3.1 km || 
|-id=408 bgcolor=#E9E9E9
| 265408 ||  || — || October 5, 2004 || Kitt Peak || Spacewatch || — || align=right | 2.9 km || 
|-id=409 bgcolor=#E9E9E9
| 265409 ||  || — || October 5, 2004 || Kitt Peak || Spacewatch || — || align=right | 3.0 km || 
|-id=410 bgcolor=#E9E9E9
| 265410 ||  || — || October 8, 2004 || Palomar || NEAT || — || align=right | 3.2 km || 
|-id=411 bgcolor=#d6d6d6
| 265411 ||  || — || October 7, 2004 || Socorro || LINEAR || — || align=right | 2.6 km || 
|-id=412 bgcolor=#d6d6d6
| 265412 ||  || — || October 6, 2004 || Kitt Peak || Spacewatch || KAR || align=right | 1.4 km || 
|-id=413 bgcolor=#d6d6d6
| 265413 ||  || — || October 6, 2004 || Kitt Peak || Spacewatch || THM || align=right | 2.7 km || 
|-id=414 bgcolor=#d6d6d6
| 265414 ||  || — || October 6, 2004 || Kitt Peak || Spacewatch || — || align=right | 2.7 km || 
|-id=415 bgcolor=#d6d6d6
| 265415 ||  || — || October 7, 2004 || Kitt Peak || Spacewatch || KOR || align=right | 1.4 km || 
|-id=416 bgcolor=#d6d6d6
| 265416 ||  || — || October 8, 2004 || Socorro || LINEAR || — || align=right | 3.7 km || 
|-id=417 bgcolor=#d6d6d6
| 265417 ||  || — || October 8, 2004 || Socorro || LINEAR || — || align=right | 5.0 km || 
|-id=418 bgcolor=#d6d6d6
| 265418 ||  || — || October 9, 2004 || Socorro || LINEAR || — || align=right | 2.8 km || 
|-id=419 bgcolor=#d6d6d6
| 265419 ||  || — || October 9, 2004 || Kitt Peak || Spacewatch || — || align=right | 2.3 km || 
|-id=420 bgcolor=#d6d6d6
| 265420 ||  || — || October 9, 2004 || Kitt Peak || Spacewatch || — || align=right | 2.2 km || 
|-id=421 bgcolor=#d6d6d6
| 265421 ||  || — || October 10, 2004 || Kitt Peak || Spacewatch || — || align=right | 3.3 km || 
|-id=422 bgcolor=#d6d6d6
| 265422 ||  || — || October 11, 2004 || Kitt Peak || Spacewatch || — || align=right | 3.1 km || 
|-id=423 bgcolor=#d6d6d6
| 265423 ||  || — || October 10, 2004 || Kitt Peak || Spacewatch || — || align=right | 2.7 km || 
|-id=424 bgcolor=#d6d6d6
| 265424 ||  || — || October 4, 2004 || Palomar || NEAT || — || align=right | 4.6 km || 
|-id=425 bgcolor=#d6d6d6
| 265425 ||  || — || October 11, 2004 || Kitt Peak || M. W. Buie || — || align=right | 2.1 km || 
|-id=426 bgcolor=#d6d6d6
| 265426 ||  || — || October 19, 2004 || Hormersdorf || Hormersdorf Obs. || EOS || align=right | 3.2 km || 
|-id=427 bgcolor=#d6d6d6
| 265427 ||  || — || October 18, 2004 || Socorro || LINEAR || — || align=right | 3.2 km || 
|-id=428 bgcolor=#d6d6d6
| 265428 ||  || — || November 3, 2004 || Kitt Peak || Spacewatch || KOR || align=right | 1.6 km || 
|-id=429 bgcolor=#d6d6d6
| 265429 ||  || — || November 4, 2004 || Kitt Peak || Spacewatch || — || align=right | 2.2 km || 
|-id=430 bgcolor=#d6d6d6
| 265430 ||  || — || November 4, 2004 || Kitt Peak || Spacewatch || — || align=right | 4.3 km || 
|-id=431 bgcolor=#d6d6d6
| 265431 ||  || — || November 7, 2004 || Palomar || NEAT || — || align=right | 4.1 km || 
|-id=432 bgcolor=#d6d6d6
| 265432 ||  || — || November 6, 2004 || Socorro || LINEAR || — || align=right | 4.6 km || 
|-id=433 bgcolor=#d6d6d6
| 265433 ||  || — || November 4, 2004 || Catalina || CSS || — || align=right | 5.0 km || 
|-id=434 bgcolor=#d6d6d6
| 265434 ||  || — || November 9, 2004 || Catalina || CSS || — || align=right | 3.5 km || 
|-id=435 bgcolor=#d6d6d6
| 265435 ||  || — || November 10, 2004 || Kitt Peak || Spacewatch || — || align=right | 3.3 km || 
|-id=436 bgcolor=#d6d6d6
| 265436 ||  || — || November 10, 2004 || Kitt Peak || Spacewatch || — || align=right | 3.3 km || 
|-id=437 bgcolor=#d6d6d6
| 265437 ||  || — || November 12, 2004 || Socorro || LINEAR || — || align=right | 3.9 km || 
|-id=438 bgcolor=#d6d6d6
| 265438 ||  || — || December 1, 2004 || Palomar || NEAT || HYG || align=right | 3.9 km || 
|-id=439 bgcolor=#d6d6d6
| 265439 ||  || — || December 8, 2004 || Socorro || LINEAR || — || align=right | 3.4 km || 
|-id=440 bgcolor=#d6d6d6
| 265440 ||  || — || December 9, 2004 || Kitt Peak || Spacewatch || — || align=right | 5.9 km || 
|-id=441 bgcolor=#d6d6d6
| 265441 ||  || — || December 11, 2004 || Kitt Peak || Spacewatch || — || align=right | 4.5 km || 
|-id=442 bgcolor=#d6d6d6
| 265442 ||  || — || December 7, 2004 || Socorro || LINEAR || TIR || align=right | 3.7 km || 
|-id=443 bgcolor=#d6d6d6
| 265443 ||  || — || December 11, 2004 || Kitt Peak || Spacewatch || HYG || align=right | 4.5 km || 
|-id=444 bgcolor=#d6d6d6
| 265444 ||  || — || December 2, 2004 || Kitt Peak || Spacewatch || HYG || align=right | 4.3 km || 
|-id=445 bgcolor=#d6d6d6
| 265445 ||  || — || December 10, 2004 || Anderson Mesa || LONEOS || EUP || align=right | 7.9 km || 
|-id=446 bgcolor=#d6d6d6
| 265446 ||  || — || December 11, 2004 || Kitt Peak || Spacewatch || VER || align=right | 4.9 km || 
|-id=447 bgcolor=#d6d6d6
| 265447 ||  || — || December 11, 2004 || Kitt Peak || Spacewatch || — || align=right | 4.5 km || 
|-id=448 bgcolor=#d6d6d6
| 265448 ||  || — || December 11, 2004 || Kitt Peak || Spacewatch || THM || align=right | 2.9 km || 
|-id=449 bgcolor=#d6d6d6
| 265449 ||  || — || December 11, 2004 || Kitt Peak || Spacewatch || — || align=right | 4.3 km || 
|-id=450 bgcolor=#d6d6d6
| 265450 ||  || — || December 11, 2004 || Kitt Peak || Spacewatch || — || align=right | 4.5 km || 
|-id=451 bgcolor=#d6d6d6
| 265451 ||  || — || December 13, 2004 || Kitt Peak || Spacewatch || — || align=right | 5.5 km || 
|-id=452 bgcolor=#d6d6d6
| 265452 ||  || — || December 13, 2004 || Anderson Mesa || LONEOS || — || align=right | 7.0 km || 
|-id=453 bgcolor=#d6d6d6
| 265453 ||  || — || December 15, 2004 || Socorro || LINEAR || — || align=right | 3.9 km || 
|-id=454 bgcolor=#d6d6d6
| 265454 ||  || — || December 10, 2004 || Socorro || LINEAR || — || align=right | 4.7 km || 
|-id=455 bgcolor=#d6d6d6
| 265455 ||  || — || December 13, 2004 || Kitt Peak || Spacewatch || — || align=right | 4.3 km || 
|-id=456 bgcolor=#d6d6d6
| 265456 ||  || — || December 3, 2004 || Kitt Peak || Spacewatch || — || align=right | 4.6 km || 
|-id=457 bgcolor=#d6d6d6
| 265457 ||  || — || December 14, 2004 || Kitt Peak || Spacewatch || EOS || align=right | 3.0 km || 
|-id=458 bgcolor=#d6d6d6
| 265458 ||  || — || December 18, 2004 || Mount Lemmon || Mount Lemmon Survey || — || align=right | 5.0 km || 
|-id=459 bgcolor=#d6d6d6
| 265459 ||  || — || December 21, 2004 || Catalina || CSS || — || align=right | 6.3 km || 
|-id=460 bgcolor=#d6d6d6
| 265460 ||  || — || January 6, 2005 || Catalina || CSS || — || align=right | 4.8 km || 
|-id=461 bgcolor=#d6d6d6
| 265461 ||  || — || January 7, 2005 || Socorro || LINEAR || EUP || align=right | 6.0 km || 
|-id=462 bgcolor=#d6d6d6
| 265462 ||  || — || January 1, 2005 || Catalina || CSS || — || align=right | 3.7 km || 
|-id=463 bgcolor=#d6d6d6
| 265463 ||  || — || January 6, 2005 || Catalina || CSS || — || align=right | 3.6 km || 
|-id=464 bgcolor=#d6d6d6
| 265464 ||  || — || January 13, 2005 || Socorro || LINEAR || — || align=right | 4.7 km || 
|-id=465 bgcolor=#d6d6d6
| 265465 ||  || — || January 13, 2005 || Socorro || LINEAR || — || align=right | 5.4 km || 
|-id=466 bgcolor=#d6d6d6
| 265466 ||  || — || January 13, 2005 || Socorro || LINEAR || 7:4 || align=right | 5.3 km || 
|-id=467 bgcolor=#d6d6d6
| 265467 ||  || — || January 13, 2005 || Socorro || LINEAR || — || align=right | 4.8 km || 
|-id=468 bgcolor=#d6d6d6
| 265468 ||  || — || January 15, 2005 || Socorro || LINEAR || — || align=right | 3.8 km || 
|-id=469 bgcolor=#d6d6d6
| 265469 ||  || — || January 15, 2005 || Catalina || CSS || — || align=right | 4.1 km || 
|-id=470 bgcolor=#d6d6d6
| 265470 ||  || — || January 15, 2005 || Kitt Peak || Spacewatch || — || align=right | 4.3 km || 
|-id=471 bgcolor=#d6d6d6
| 265471 ||  || — || January 15, 2005 || Kitt Peak || Spacewatch || CRO || align=right | 4.1 km || 
|-id=472 bgcolor=#d6d6d6
| 265472 ||  || — || January 13, 2005 || Kitt Peak || Spacewatch || — || align=right | 6.4 km || 
|-id=473 bgcolor=#d6d6d6
| 265473 ||  || — || January 16, 2005 || Socorro || LINEAR || — || align=right | 4.1 km || 
|-id=474 bgcolor=#fefefe
| 265474 ||  || — || January 16, 2005 || Socorro || LINEAR || — || align=right | 1.3 km || 
|-id=475 bgcolor=#d6d6d6
| 265475 ||  || — || January 16, 2005 || Socorro || LINEAR || — || align=right | 6.0 km || 
|-id=476 bgcolor=#d6d6d6
| 265476 ||  || — || January 16, 2005 || Socorro || LINEAR || EUP || align=right | 4.6 km || 
|-id=477 bgcolor=#d6d6d6
| 265477 ||  || — || January 17, 2005 || Socorro || LINEAR || — || align=right | 5.4 km || 
|-id=478 bgcolor=#d6d6d6
| 265478 ||  || — || February 2, 2005 || Socorro || LINEAR || — || align=right | 4.2 km || 
|-id=479 bgcolor=#d6d6d6
| 265479 ||  || — || February 9, 2005 || Socorro || LINEAR || EOS || align=right | 2.9 km || 
|-id=480 bgcolor=#d6d6d6
| 265480 ||  || — || February 9, 2005 || Anderson Mesa || LONEOS || EOS || align=right | 2.7 km || 
|-id=481 bgcolor=#d6d6d6
| 265481 ||  || — || February 14, 2005 || Socorro || LINEAR || VER || align=right | 4.6 km || 
|-id=482 bgcolor=#FFC2E0
| 265482 ||  || — || March 1, 2005 || Catalina || CSS || APOPHA || align=right data-sort-value="0.21" | 210 m || 
|-id=483 bgcolor=#d6d6d6
| 265483 ||  || — || March 1, 2005 || Kitt Peak || Spacewatch || — || align=right | 5.8 km || 
|-id=484 bgcolor=#d6d6d6
| 265484 ||  || — || March 2, 2005 || Kitt Peak || Spacewatch || — || align=right | 4.3 km || 
|-id=485 bgcolor=#d6d6d6
| 265485 ||  || — || March 2, 2005 || Catalina || CSS || — || align=right | 4.4 km || 
|-id=486 bgcolor=#d6d6d6
| 265486 ||  || — || March 8, 2005 || Kitt Peak || Spacewatch || EUP || align=right | 6.0 km || 
|-id=487 bgcolor=#d6d6d6
| 265487 ||  || — || March 8, 2005 || Socorro || LINEAR || — || align=right | 4.8 km || 
|-id=488 bgcolor=#fefefe
| 265488 ||  || — || March 11, 2005 || Mount Lemmon || Mount Lemmon Survey || NYS || align=right data-sort-value="0.79" | 790 m || 
|-id=489 bgcolor=#fefefe
| 265489 ||  || — || March 10, 2005 || Catalina || CSS || — || align=right | 1.2 km || 
|-id=490 bgcolor=#fefefe
| 265490 Szabados || 2005 GW ||  || April 1, 2005 || Piszkéstető || K. Sárneczky || V || align=right data-sort-value="0.85" | 850 m || 
|-id=491 bgcolor=#d6d6d6
| 265491 ||  || — || April 1, 2005 || Anderson Mesa || LONEOS || EUP || align=right | 6.6 km || 
|-id=492 bgcolor=#d6d6d6
| 265492 ||  || — || April 1, 2005 || Anderson Mesa || LONEOS || 7:4 || align=right | 8.0 km || 
|-id=493 bgcolor=#fefefe
| 265493 ||  || — || April 2, 2005 || Palomar || NEAT || — || align=right data-sort-value="0.91" | 910 m || 
|-id=494 bgcolor=#fefefe
| 265494 ||  || — || April 2, 2005 || Mount Lemmon || Mount Lemmon Survey || — || align=right data-sort-value="0.84" | 840 m || 
|-id=495 bgcolor=#fefefe
| 265495 ||  || — || April 5, 2005 || Mount Lemmon || Mount Lemmon Survey || — || align=right data-sort-value="0.73" | 730 m || 
|-id=496 bgcolor=#fefefe
| 265496 ||  || — || April 7, 2005 || Kitt Peak || Spacewatch || — || align=right data-sort-value="0.76" | 760 m || 
|-id=497 bgcolor=#fefefe
| 265497 ||  || — || April 10, 2005 || Kitt Peak || Spacewatch || — || align=right data-sort-value="0.77" | 770 m || 
|-id=498 bgcolor=#fefefe
| 265498 ||  || — || April 11, 2005 || Kitt Peak || Spacewatch || FLO || align=right data-sort-value="0.75" | 750 m || 
|-id=499 bgcolor=#fefefe
| 265499 ||  || — || April 14, 2005 || Kitt Peak || Spacewatch || FLO || align=right data-sort-value="0.58" | 580 m || 
|-id=500 bgcolor=#d6d6d6
| 265500 ||  || — || May 3, 2005 || Socorro || LINEAR || TIR || align=right | 3.8 km || 
|}

265501–265600 

|-bgcolor=#fefefe
| 265501 ||  || — || May 4, 2005 || Mauna Kea || C. Veillet || — || align=right data-sort-value="0.89" | 890 m || 
|-id=502 bgcolor=#d6d6d6
| 265502 ||  || — || May 2, 2005 || Kitt Peak || Spacewatch || — || align=right | 3.5 km || 
|-id=503 bgcolor=#fefefe
| 265503 ||  || — || May 3, 2005 || Kitt Peak || Spacewatch || — || align=right data-sort-value="0.95" | 950 m || 
|-id=504 bgcolor=#fefefe
| 265504 ||  || — || May 4, 2005 || Kitt Peak || Spacewatch || — || align=right data-sort-value="0.91" | 910 m || 
|-id=505 bgcolor=#E9E9E9
| 265505 ||  || — || May 4, 2005 || Kitt Peak || Spacewatch || — || align=right | 1.2 km || 
|-id=506 bgcolor=#fefefe
| 265506 ||  || — || May 4, 2005 || Kitt Peak || Spacewatch || V || align=right | 1.0 km || 
|-id=507 bgcolor=#E9E9E9
| 265507 ||  || — || May 6, 2005 || Kitt Peak || Spacewatch || — || align=right | 2.5 km || 
|-id=508 bgcolor=#fefefe
| 265508 ||  || — || May 10, 2005 || Mount Lemmon || Mount Lemmon Survey || — || align=right | 1.1 km || 
|-id=509 bgcolor=#fefefe
| 265509 ||  || — || May 11, 2005 || Palomar || NEAT || — || align=right | 1.1 km || 
|-id=510 bgcolor=#fefefe
| 265510 ||  || — || May 7, 2005 || Mount Lemmon || Mount Lemmon Survey || FLO || align=right data-sort-value="0.79" | 790 m || 
|-id=511 bgcolor=#d6d6d6
| 265511 ||  || — || May 14, 2005 || Mount Lemmon || Mount Lemmon Survey || 3:2 || align=right | 5.7 km || 
|-id=512 bgcolor=#fefefe
| 265512 ||  || — || May 20, 2005 || Mount Lemmon || Mount Lemmon Survey || — || align=right data-sort-value="0.73" | 730 m || 
|-id=513 bgcolor=#fefefe
| 265513 ||  || — || June 2, 2005 || Socorro || LINEAR || PHO || align=right | 1.3 km || 
|-id=514 bgcolor=#fefefe
| 265514 ||  || — || June 8, 2005 || Kitt Peak || Spacewatch || NYS || align=right data-sort-value="0.67" | 670 m || 
|-id=515 bgcolor=#fefefe
| 265515 ||  || — || June 6, 2005 || Kitt Peak || Spacewatch || — || align=right data-sort-value="0.93" | 930 m || 
|-id=516 bgcolor=#fefefe
| 265516 ||  || — || June 13, 2005 || Mount Lemmon || Mount Lemmon Survey || FLO || align=right data-sort-value="0.96" | 960 m || 
|-id=517 bgcolor=#fefefe
| 265517 ||  || — || June 27, 2005 || Junk Bond || D. Healy || — || align=right data-sort-value="0.86" | 860 m || 
|-id=518 bgcolor=#fefefe
| 265518 ||  || — || June 28, 2005 || Kitt Peak || Spacewatch || FLO || align=right data-sort-value="0.89" | 890 m || 
|-id=519 bgcolor=#fefefe
| 265519 ||  || — || June 28, 2005 || Kitt Peak || Spacewatch || V || align=right | 1.2 km || 
|-id=520 bgcolor=#fefefe
| 265520 ||  || — || June 27, 2005 || Kitt Peak || Spacewatch || FLO || align=right data-sort-value="0.76" | 760 m || 
|-id=521 bgcolor=#fefefe
| 265521 ||  || — || June 30, 2005 || Kitt Peak || Spacewatch || — || align=right | 1.1 km || 
|-id=522 bgcolor=#fefefe
| 265522 ||  || — || June 29, 2005 || Palomar || NEAT || NYS || align=right data-sort-value="0.89" | 890 m || 
|-id=523 bgcolor=#fefefe
| 265523 ||  || — || June 30, 2005 || Kitt Peak || Spacewatch || FLO || align=right data-sort-value="0.95" | 950 m || 
|-id=524 bgcolor=#fefefe
| 265524 ||  || — || June 29, 2005 || Palomar || NEAT || — || align=right | 1.0 km || 
|-id=525 bgcolor=#fefefe
| 265525 ||  || — || June 27, 2005 || Palomar || NEAT || — || align=right data-sort-value="0.90" | 900 m || 
|-id=526 bgcolor=#fefefe
| 265526 ||  || — || July 1, 2005 || Wrightwood || J. W. Young || NYS || align=right data-sort-value="0.99" | 990 m || 
|-id=527 bgcolor=#fefefe
| 265527 ||  || — || July 1, 2005 || Kitt Peak || Spacewatch || — || align=right | 1.3 km || 
|-id=528 bgcolor=#fefefe
| 265528 ||  || — || July 6, 2005 || Reedy Creek || J. Broughton || — || align=right | 1.4 km || 
|-id=529 bgcolor=#fefefe
| 265529 ||  || — || July 1, 2005 || Kitt Peak || Spacewatch || — || align=right | 1.0 km || 
|-id=530 bgcolor=#fefefe
| 265530 ||  || — || July 5, 2005 || Kitt Peak || Spacewatch || NYS || align=right | 1.0 km || 
|-id=531 bgcolor=#fefefe
| 265531 ||  || — || July 5, 2005 || Kitt Peak || Spacewatch || NYS || align=right data-sort-value="0.76" | 760 m || 
|-id=532 bgcolor=#fefefe
| 265532 ||  || — || July 6, 2005 || Kitt Peak || Spacewatch || — || align=right data-sort-value="0.85" | 850 m || 
|-id=533 bgcolor=#fefefe
| 265533 ||  || — || July 5, 2005 || Kitt Peak || Spacewatch || — || align=right | 1.2 km || 
|-id=534 bgcolor=#fefefe
| 265534 ||  || — || July 11, 2005 || Mount Lemmon || Mount Lemmon Survey || — || align=right | 1.1 km || 
|-id=535 bgcolor=#fefefe
| 265535 ||  || — || July 9, 2005 || Kitt Peak || Spacewatch || — || align=right data-sort-value="0.79" | 790 m || 
|-id=536 bgcolor=#fefefe
| 265536 ||  || — || July 12, 2005 || Junk Bond || D. Healy || — || align=right data-sort-value="0.82" | 820 m || 
|-id=537 bgcolor=#fefefe
| 265537 ||  || — || July 7, 2005 || Reedy Creek || J. Broughton || — || align=right | 1.1 km || 
|-id=538 bgcolor=#fefefe
| 265538 ||  || — || July 15, 2005 || Reedy Creek || J. Broughton || LCI || align=right | 1.9 km || 
|-id=539 bgcolor=#fefefe
| 265539 ||  || — || July 4, 2005 || Palomar || NEAT || V || align=right | 1.1 km || 
|-id=540 bgcolor=#E9E9E9
| 265540 ||  || — || July 4, 2005 || Palomar || NEAT || — || align=right | 1.2 km || 
|-id=541 bgcolor=#fefefe
| 265541 ||  || — || July 3, 2005 || Palomar || NEAT || — || align=right | 1.2 km || 
|-id=542 bgcolor=#fefefe
| 265542 ||  || — || July 26, 2005 || Palomar || NEAT || — || align=right | 1.4 km || 
|-id=543 bgcolor=#fefefe
| 265543 ||  || — || July 26, 2005 || Reedy Creek || J. Broughton || — || align=right | 1.9 km || 
|-id=544 bgcolor=#fefefe
| 265544 ||  || — || July 28, 2005 || Palomar || NEAT || — || align=right | 1.2 km || 
|-id=545 bgcolor=#fefefe
| 265545 ||  || — || July 28, 2005 || Palomar || NEAT || NYS || align=right data-sort-value="0.98" | 980 m || 
|-id=546 bgcolor=#fefefe
| 265546 ||  || — || July 27, 2005 || Palomar || NEAT || — || align=right | 1.4 km || 
|-id=547 bgcolor=#fefefe
| 265547 ||  || — || July 29, 2005 || Palomar || NEAT || — || align=right | 1.1 km || 
|-id=548 bgcolor=#E9E9E9
| 265548 ||  || — || July 30, 2005 || Palomar || NEAT || — || align=right | 4.1 km || 
|-id=549 bgcolor=#FA8072
| 265549 ||  || — || July 28, 2005 || Reedy Creek || J. Broughton || — || align=right data-sort-value="0.94" | 940 m || 
|-id=550 bgcolor=#fefefe
| 265550 ||  || — || July 29, 2005 || Needville || J. Dellinger, D. Wells || FLO || align=right data-sort-value="0.89" | 890 m || 
|-id=551 bgcolor=#fefefe
| 265551 ||  || — || July 28, 2005 || Palomar || NEAT || — || align=right | 1.4 km || 
|-id=552 bgcolor=#fefefe
| 265552 ||  || — || August 1, 2005 || Siding Spring || SSS || V || align=right data-sort-value="0.92" | 920 m || 
|-id=553 bgcolor=#fefefe
| 265553 ||  || — || August 2, 2005 || Socorro || LINEAR || ERI || align=right | 2.0 km || 
|-id=554 bgcolor=#fefefe
| 265554 ||  || — || August 4, 2005 || Palomar || NEAT || — || align=right | 1.2 km || 
|-id=555 bgcolor=#E9E9E9
| 265555 ||  || — || August 4, 2005 || Palomar || NEAT || — || align=right | 1.1 km || 
|-id=556 bgcolor=#E9E9E9
| 265556 ||  || — || August 4, 2005 || Palomar || NEAT || — || align=right | 1.0 km || 
|-id=557 bgcolor=#fefefe
| 265557 ||  || — || August 4, 2005 || Palomar || NEAT || NYS || align=right | 1.1 km || 
|-id=558 bgcolor=#fefefe
| 265558 ||  || — || August 1, 2005 || Siding Spring || SSS || — || align=right | 1.1 km || 
|-id=559 bgcolor=#E9E9E9
| 265559 ||  || — || August 10, 2005 || Cerro Tololo || M. W. Buie || — || align=right data-sort-value="0.87" | 870 m || 
|-id=560 bgcolor=#fefefe
| 265560 ||  || — || August 24, 2005 || Palomar || NEAT || FLO || align=right | 1.0 km || 
|-id=561 bgcolor=#E9E9E9
| 265561 ||  || — || August 26, 2005 || Anderson Mesa || LONEOS || — || align=right | 1.9 km || 
|-id=562 bgcolor=#fefefe
| 265562 ||  || — || August 25, 2005 || Palomar || NEAT || — || align=right | 1.1 km || 
|-id=563 bgcolor=#E9E9E9
| 265563 ||  || — || August 25, 2005 || Palomar || NEAT || — || align=right | 1.8 km || 
|-id=564 bgcolor=#fefefe
| 265564 ||  || — || August 26, 2005 || Palomar || NEAT || MAS || align=right data-sort-value="0.85" | 850 m || 
|-id=565 bgcolor=#fefefe
| 265565 ||  || — || August 26, 2005 || Palomar || NEAT || V || align=right data-sort-value="0.96" | 960 m || 
|-id=566 bgcolor=#fefefe
| 265566 ||  || — || August 26, 2005 || Anderson Mesa || LONEOS || — || align=right | 1.1 km || 
|-id=567 bgcolor=#fefefe
| 265567 ||  || — || August 26, 2005 || Palomar || NEAT || — || align=right | 1.1 km || 
|-id=568 bgcolor=#E9E9E9
| 265568 ||  || — || August 24, 2005 || Palomar || NEAT || JUN || align=right | 1.1 km || 
|-id=569 bgcolor=#fefefe
| 265569 ||  || — || August 27, 2005 || Anderson Mesa || LONEOS || ERI || align=right | 2.0 km || 
|-id=570 bgcolor=#d6d6d6
| 265570 ||  || — || February 1, 2003 || Kitt Peak || Spacewatch || KOR || align=right | 1.7 km || 
|-id=571 bgcolor=#E9E9E9
| 265571 ||  || — || August 25, 2005 || Palomar || NEAT || — || align=right | 2.2 km || 
|-id=572 bgcolor=#fefefe
| 265572 ||  || — || August 27, 2005 || Palomar || NEAT || MAS || align=right data-sort-value="0.78" | 780 m || 
|-id=573 bgcolor=#E9E9E9
| 265573 ||  || — || August 27, 2005 || Palomar || NEAT || — || align=right | 1.0 km || 
|-id=574 bgcolor=#E9E9E9
| 265574 ||  || — || August 27, 2005 || Palomar || NEAT || — || align=right | 1.7 km || 
|-id=575 bgcolor=#E9E9E9
| 265575 ||  || — || August 27, 2005 || Palomar || NEAT || — || align=right | 1.1 km || 
|-id=576 bgcolor=#fefefe
| 265576 ||  || — || August 28, 2005 || Kitt Peak || Spacewatch || — || align=right | 1.2 km || 
|-id=577 bgcolor=#fefefe
| 265577 ||  || — || August 28, 2005 || Kitt Peak || Spacewatch || NYS || align=right | 1.1 km || 
|-id=578 bgcolor=#fefefe
| 265578 ||  || — || August 28, 2005 || Kitt Peak || Spacewatch || NYS || align=right data-sort-value="0.80" | 800 m || 
|-id=579 bgcolor=#E9E9E9
| 265579 ||  || — || August 28, 2005 || Kitt Peak || Spacewatch || — || align=right | 1.7 km || 
|-id=580 bgcolor=#fefefe
| 265580 ||  || — || August 28, 2005 || Kitt Peak || Spacewatch || EUT || align=right data-sort-value="0.92" | 920 m || 
|-id=581 bgcolor=#E9E9E9
| 265581 ||  || — || August 28, 2005 || Siding Spring || SSS || EUN || align=right | 1.3 km || 
|-id=582 bgcolor=#fefefe
| 265582 ||  || — || August 28, 2005 || Siding Spring || SSS || — || align=right | 1.3 km || 
|-id=583 bgcolor=#E9E9E9
| 265583 ||  || — || August 28, 2005 || Siding Spring || SSS || — || align=right | 1.5 km || 
|-id=584 bgcolor=#fefefe
| 265584 ||  || — || August 28, 2005 || Siding Spring || SSS || — || align=right | 1.1 km || 
|-id=585 bgcolor=#E9E9E9
| 265585 ||  || — || August 27, 2005 || Anderson Mesa || LONEOS || MAR || align=right | 1.3 km || 
|-id=586 bgcolor=#E9E9E9
| 265586 ||  || — || August 27, 2005 || Palomar || NEAT || — || align=right | 1.6 km || 
|-id=587 bgcolor=#E9E9E9
| 265587 ||  || — || August 28, 2005 || Anderson Mesa || LONEOS || EUN || align=right | 1.5 km || 
|-id=588 bgcolor=#fefefe
| 265588 ||  || — || August 28, 2005 || Anderson Mesa || LONEOS || — || align=right | 1.5 km || 
|-id=589 bgcolor=#E9E9E9
| 265589 ||  || — || August 30, 2005 || Palomar || NEAT || — || align=right | 1.8 km || 
|-id=590 bgcolor=#E9E9E9
| 265590 ||  || — || August 31, 2005 || Palomar || NEAT || — || align=right | 2.3 km || 
|-id=591 bgcolor=#fefefe
| 265591 ||  || — || August 31, 2005 || Palomar || NEAT || — || align=right | 1.4 km || 
|-id=592 bgcolor=#E9E9E9
| 265592 ||  || — || August 26, 2005 || Palomar || NEAT || — || align=right | 3.2 km || 
|-id=593 bgcolor=#fefefe
| 265593 ||  || — || September 1, 2005 || Palomar || NEAT || — || align=right data-sort-value="0.89" | 890 m || 
|-id=594 bgcolor=#fefefe
| 265594 Keletiágnes ||  ||  || September 5, 2005 || Piszkéstető || K. Sárneczky || NYS || align=right data-sort-value="0.72" | 720 m || 
|-id=595 bgcolor=#E9E9E9
| 265595 ||  || — || September 9, 2005 || Socorro || LINEAR || EUN || align=right | 1.4 km || 
|-id=596 bgcolor=#fefefe
| 265596 ||  || — || September 1, 2005 || Kitt Peak || Spacewatch || NYS || align=right data-sort-value="0.86" | 860 m || 
|-id=597 bgcolor=#E9E9E9
| 265597 ||  || — || September 1, 2005 || Palomar || NEAT || — || align=right | 2.2 km || 
|-id=598 bgcolor=#E9E9E9
| 265598 ||  || — || September 1, 2005 || Palomar || NEAT || MAR || align=right | 1.4 km || 
|-id=599 bgcolor=#fefefe
| 265599 ||  || — || September 9, 2005 || Socorro || LINEAR || — || align=right | 1.3 km || 
|-id=600 bgcolor=#E9E9E9
| 265600 ||  || — || September 10, 2005 || Anderson Mesa || LONEOS || — || align=right | 2.3 km || 
|}

265601–265700 

|-bgcolor=#E9E9E9
| 265601 ||  || — || September 10, 2005 || Anderson Mesa || LONEOS || EUN || align=right | 1.4 km || 
|-id=602 bgcolor=#E9E9E9
| 265602 ||  || — || September 10, 2005 || Anderson Mesa || LONEOS || EUN || align=right | 1.6 km || 
|-id=603 bgcolor=#E9E9E9
| 265603 ||  || — || September 13, 2005 || Catalina || CSS || GER || align=right | 1.8 km || 
|-id=604 bgcolor=#E9E9E9
| 265604 ||  || — || September 23, 2005 || Kitt Peak || Spacewatch || — || align=right | 2.2 km || 
|-id=605 bgcolor=#E9E9E9
| 265605 ||  || — || September 23, 2005 || Kitt Peak || Spacewatch || JUN || align=right | 1.5 km || 
|-id=606 bgcolor=#E9E9E9
| 265606 ||  || — || September 23, 2005 || Kitt Peak || Spacewatch || — || align=right | 1.1 km || 
|-id=607 bgcolor=#fefefe
| 265607 ||  || — || September 23, 2005 || Kitt Peak || Spacewatch || — || align=right | 1.3 km || 
|-id=608 bgcolor=#d6d6d6
| 265608 ||  || — || September 23, 2005 || Kitt Peak || Spacewatch || — || align=right | 2.8 km || 
|-id=609 bgcolor=#E9E9E9
| 265609 ||  || — || September 24, 2005 || Kitt Peak || Spacewatch || NEM || align=right | 3.6 km || 
|-id=610 bgcolor=#E9E9E9
| 265610 ||  || — || September 24, 2005 || Kitt Peak || Spacewatch || — || align=right | 1.1 km || 
|-id=611 bgcolor=#E9E9E9
| 265611 ||  || — || September 24, 2005 || Kitt Peak || Spacewatch || — || align=right | 1.4 km || 
|-id=612 bgcolor=#E9E9E9
| 265612 ||  || — || September 24, 2005 || Kitt Peak || Spacewatch || — || align=right data-sort-value="0.95" | 950 m || 
|-id=613 bgcolor=#E9E9E9
| 265613 ||  || — || September 27, 2005 || Kitt Peak || Spacewatch || — || align=right | 1.4 km || 
|-id=614 bgcolor=#fefefe
| 265614 ||  || — || September 24, 2005 || Kitt Peak || Spacewatch || NYS || align=right data-sort-value="0.73" | 730 m || 
|-id=615 bgcolor=#E9E9E9
| 265615 ||  || — || September 24, 2005 || Kitt Peak || Spacewatch || — || align=right | 1.5 km || 
|-id=616 bgcolor=#E9E9E9
| 265616 ||  || — || September 24, 2005 || Kitt Peak || Spacewatch || MAR || align=right | 1.5 km || 
|-id=617 bgcolor=#E9E9E9
| 265617 ||  || — || September 25, 2005 || Palomar || NEAT || — || align=right | 3.0 km || 
|-id=618 bgcolor=#E9E9E9
| 265618 ||  || — || September 28, 2005 || Palomar || NEAT || — || align=right | 1.3 km || 
|-id=619 bgcolor=#fefefe
| 265619 ||  || — || September 29, 2005 || Mount Lemmon || Mount Lemmon Survey || V || align=right data-sort-value="0.84" | 840 m || 
|-id=620 bgcolor=#E9E9E9
| 265620 ||  || — || September 29, 2005 || Kitt Peak || Spacewatch || — || align=right | 2.2 km || 
|-id=621 bgcolor=#fefefe
| 265621 ||  || — || September 30, 2005 || Mount Lemmon || Mount Lemmon Survey || NYS || align=right data-sort-value="0.76" | 760 m || 
|-id=622 bgcolor=#fefefe
| 265622 ||  || — || September 25, 2005 || Palomar || NEAT || LCI || align=right | 1.5 km || 
|-id=623 bgcolor=#fefefe
| 265623 ||  || — || September 25, 2005 || Kitt Peak || Spacewatch || — || align=right | 1.2 km || 
|-id=624 bgcolor=#E9E9E9
| 265624 ||  || — || September 25, 2005 || Kitt Peak || Spacewatch || — || align=right | 1.8 km || 
|-id=625 bgcolor=#E9E9E9
| 265625 ||  || — || September 26, 2005 || Kitt Peak || Spacewatch || — || align=right | 2.2 km || 
|-id=626 bgcolor=#d6d6d6
| 265626 ||  || — || September 29, 2005 || Kitt Peak || Spacewatch || — || align=right | 2.9 km || 
|-id=627 bgcolor=#E9E9E9
| 265627 ||  || — || September 29, 2005 || Mount Lemmon || Mount Lemmon Survey || — || align=right | 1.1 km || 
|-id=628 bgcolor=#fefefe
| 265628 ||  || — || September 30, 2005 || Kitt Peak || Spacewatch || NYS || align=right data-sort-value="0.74" | 740 m || 
|-id=629 bgcolor=#E9E9E9
| 265629 ||  || — || September 30, 2005 || Palomar || NEAT || — || align=right | 2.4 km || 
|-id=630 bgcolor=#E9E9E9
| 265630 ||  || — || September 29, 2005 || Catalina || CSS || — || align=right | 1.7 km || 
|-id=631 bgcolor=#fefefe
| 265631 ||  || — || September 27, 2005 || Socorro || LINEAR || — || align=right | 1.4 km || 
|-id=632 bgcolor=#E9E9E9
| 265632 ||  || — || September 29, 2005 || Siding Spring || SSS || JUN || align=right | 1.3 km || 
|-id=633 bgcolor=#E9E9E9
| 265633 ||  || — || September 28, 2005 || Palomar || NEAT || — || align=right | 1.7 km || 
|-id=634 bgcolor=#E9E9E9
| 265634 ||  || — || September 29, 2005 || Mount Lemmon || Mount Lemmon Survey || — || align=right | 1.9 km || 
|-id=635 bgcolor=#fefefe
| 265635 ||  || — || September 23, 2005 || Kitt Peak || Spacewatch || MAS || align=right data-sort-value="0.97" | 970 m || 
|-id=636 bgcolor=#E9E9E9
| 265636 ||  || — || September 23, 2005 || Kitt Peak || Spacewatch || — || align=right | 1.3 km || 
|-id=637 bgcolor=#E9E9E9
| 265637 ||  || — || September 30, 2005 || Mount Lemmon || Mount Lemmon Survey || — || align=right | 2.0 km || 
|-id=638 bgcolor=#E9E9E9
| 265638 ||  || — || October 1, 2005 || Mount Lemmon || Mount Lemmon Survey || — || align=right | 1.6 km || 
|-id=639 bgcolor=#E9E9E9
| 265639 ||  || — || October 1, 2005 || Kitt Peak || Spacewatch || — || align=right | 1.4 km || 
|-id=640 bgcolor=#E9E9E9
| 265640 ||  || — || October 1, 2005 || Mount Lemmon || Mount Lemmon Survey || — || align=right | 2.2 km || 
|-id=641 bgcolor=#E9E9E9
| 265641 ||  || — || October 1, 2005 || Catalina || CSS || — || align=right | 1.6 km || 
|-id=642 bgcolor=#E9E9E9
| 265642 ||  || — || October 3, 2005 || Palomar || NEAT || — || align=right | 2.4 km || 
|-id=643 bgcolor=#E9E9E9
| 265643 ||  || — || October 5, 2005 || Mount Lemmon || Mount Lemmon Survey || — || align=right | 1.4 km || 
|-id=644 bgcolor=#E9E9E9
| 265644 ||  || — || October 6, 2005 || Catalina || CSS || — || align=right | 1.4 km || 
|-id=645 bgcolor=#E9E9E9
| 265645 ||  || — || October 5, 2005 || Catalina || CSS || — || align=right | 1.6 km || 
|-id=646 bgcolor=#E9E9E9
| 265646 ||  || — || October 3, 2005 || Palomar || NEAT || ADE || align=right | 3.0 km || 
|-id=647 bgcolor=#E9E9E9
| 265647 ||  || — || October 6, 2005 || Kitt Peak || Spacewatch || — || align=right | 1.1 km || 
|-id=648 bgcolor=#E9E9E9
| 265648 ||  || — || October 8, 2005 || Socorro || LINEAR || — || align=right | 1.4 km || 
|-id=649 bgcolor=#E9E9E9
| 265649 ||  || — || October 8, 2005 || Socorro || LINEAR || INO || align=right | 1.7 km || 
|-id=650 bgcolor=#fefefe
| 265650 ||  || — || October 7, 2005 || Kitt Peak || Spacewatch || NYS || align=right | 1.00 km || 
|-id=651 bgcolor=#E9E9E9
| 265651 ||  || — || October 7, 2005 || Kitt Peak || Spacewatch || — || align=right | 1.3 km || 
|-id=652 bgcolor=#fefefe
| 265652 ||  || — || October 7, 2005 || Catalina || CSS || — || align=right | 1.1 km || 
|-id=653 bgcolor=#E9E9E9
| 265653 ||  || — || October 7, 2005 || Kitt Peak || Spacewatch || — || align=right | 1.0 km || 
|-id=654 bgcolor=#E9E9E9
| 265654 ||  || — || October 8, 2005 || Catalina || CSS || MAR || align=right | 1.4 km || 
|-id=655 bgcolor=#E9E9E9
| 265655 ||  || — || October 6, 2005 || Kitt Peak || Spacewatch || MRX || align=right | 1.3 km || 
|-id=656 bgcolor=#E9E9E9
| 265656 ||  || — || October 8, 2005 || Kitt Peak || Spacewatch || — || align=right | 1.3 km || 
|-id=657 bgcolor=#E9E9E9
| 265657 ||  || — || October 8, 2005 || Kitt Peak || Spacewatch || — || align=right | 2.6 km || 
|-id=658 bgcolor=#E9E9E9
| 265658 ||  || — || October 1, 2005 || Anderson Mesa || LONEOS || EUN || align=right | 1.6 km || 
|-id=659 bgcolor=#E9E9E9
| 265659 ||  || — || October 7, 2005 || Kitt Peak || Spacewatch || — || align=right | 1.3 km || 
|-id=660 bgcolor=#E9E9E9
| 265660 ||  || — || October 1, 2005 || Anderson Mesa || LONEOS || — || align=right | 1.5 km || 
|-id=661 bgcolor=#FFC2E0
| 265661 ||  || — || October 21, 2005 || Socorro || LINEAR || APO +1km || align=right | 1.7 km || 
|-id=662 bgcolor=#E9E9E9
| 265662 ||  || — || October 21, 2005 || Palomar || NEAT || WIT || align=right | 1.4 km || 
|-id=663 bgcolor=#E9E9E9
| 265663 ||  || — || October 22, 2005 || Kitt Peak || Spacewatch || — || align=right | 2.4 km || 
|-id=664 bgcolor=#E9E9E9
| 265664 ||  || — || October 23, 2005 || Kitt Peak || Spacewatch || — || align=right | 1.2 km || 
|-id=665 bgcolor=#E9E9E9
| 265665 ||  || — || October 23, 2005 || Kitt Peak || Spacewatch || — || align=right | 1.3 km || 
|-id=666 bgcolor=#d6d6d6
| 265666 ||  || — || March 23, 2003 || Apache Point || SDSS || BRA || align=right | 1.6 km || 
|-id=667 bgcolor=#E9E9E9
| 265667 ||  || — || October 23, 2005 || Catalina || CSS || — || align=right | 1.8 km || 
|-id=668 bgcolor=#E9E9E9
| 265668 ||  || — || October 24, 2005 || Kitt Peak || Spacewatch || — || align=right | 1.6 km || 
|-id=669 bgcolor=#E9E9E9
| 265669 ||  || — || October 23, 2005 || Catalina || CSS || — || align=right | 1.7 km || 
|-id=670 bgcolor=#d6d6d6
| 265670 ||  || — || October 23, 2005 || Catalina || CSS || — || align=right | 2.8 km || 
|-id=671 bgcolor=#E9E9E9
| 265671 ||  || — || October 23, 2005 || Catalina || CSS || — || align=right | 1.9 km || 
|-id=672 bgcolor=#d6d6d6
| 265672 ||  || — || October 23, 2005 || Catalina || CSS || — || align=right | 3.7 km || 
|-id=673 bgcolor=#E9E9E9
| 265673 ||  || — || October 23, 2005 || Catalina || CSS || — || align=right | 2.5 km || 
|-id=674 bgcolor=#E9E9E9
| 265674 ||  || — || October 23, 2005 || Catalina || CSS || — || align=right | 2.0 km || 
|-id=675 bgcolor=#E9E9E9
| 265675 ||  || — || October 24, 2005 || Kitt Peak || Spacewatch || — || align=right | 2.5 km || 
|-id=676 bgcolor=#E9E9E9
| 265676 ||  || — || October 24, 2005 || Kitt Peak || Spacewatch || — || align=right | 1.3 km || 
|-id=677 bgcolor=#E9E9E9
| 265677 ||  || — || October 22, 2005 || Kitt Peak || Spacewatch || — || align=right | 2.7 km || 
|-id=678 bgcolor=#E9E9E9
| 265678 ||  || — || October 22, 2005 || Palomar || NEAT || — || align=right | 1.3 km || 
|-id=679 bgcolor=#E9E9E9
| 265679 ||  || — || October 23, 2005 || Catalina || CSS || — || align=right | 3.1 km || 
|-id=680 bgcolor=#E9E9E9
| 265680 ||  || — || October 23, 2005 || Palomar || NEAT || — || align=right | 2.0 km || 
|-id=681 bgcolor=#E9E9E9
| 265681 ||  || — || October 24, 2005 || Palomar || NEAT || — || align=right | 2.1 km || 
|-id=682 bgcolor=#E9E9E9
| 265682 ||  || — || October 25, 2005 || Palomar || NEAT || GER || align=right | 1.6 km || 
|-id=683 bgcolor=#E9E9E9
| 265683 ||  || — || October 25, 2005 || Catalina || CSS || 526 || align=right | 3.7 km || 
|-id=684 bgcolor=#E9E9E9
| 265684 ||  || — || October 22, 2005 || Kitt Peak || Spacewatch || — || align=right data-sort-value="0.92" | 920 m || 
|-id=685 bgcolor=#E9E9E9
| 265685 ||  || — || October 22, 2005 || Kitt Peak || Spacewatch || — || align=right | 1.6 km || 
|-id=686 bgcolor=#E9E9E9
| 265686 ||  || — || October 22, 2005 || Kitt Peak || Spacewatch || — || align=right | 2.2 km || 
|-id=687 bgcolor=#E9E9E9
| 265687 ||  || — || October 22, 2005 || Kitt Peak || Spacewatch || — || align=right | 1.1 km || 
|-id=688 bgcolor=#E9E9E9
| 265688 ||  || — || October 22, 2005 || Palomar || NEAT || — || align=right | 1.4 km || 
|-id=689 bgcolor=#E9E9E9
| 265689 ||  || — || October 23, 2005 || Catalina || CSS || RAF || align=right | 1.1 km || 
|-id=690 bgcolor=#E9E9E9
| 265690 ||  || — || October 23, 2005 || Catalina || CSS || — || align=right | 1.6 km || 
|-id=691 bgcolor=#E9E9E9
| 265691 ||  || — || October 24, 2005 || Kitt Peak || Spacewatch || — || align=right | 1.1 km || 
|-id=692 bgcolor=#E9E9E9
| 265692 ||  || — || October 24, 2005 || Kitt Peak || Spacewatch || — || align=right | 1.8 km || 
|-id=693 bgcolor=#E9E9E9
| 265693 ||  || — || October 24, 2005 || Kitt Peak || Spacewatch || — || align=right | 1.4 km || 
|-id=694 bgcolor=#E9E9E9
| 265694 ||  || — || October 24, 2005 || Kitt Peak || Spacewatch || — || align=right | 2.3 km || 
|-id=695 bgcolor=#E9E9E9
| 265695 ||  || — || October 24, 2005 || Palomar || NEAT || — || align=right | 2.8 km || 
|-id=696 bgcolor=#E9E9E9
| 265696 ||  || — || October 26, 2005 || Kitt Peak || Spacewatch || — || align=right | 1.4 km || 
|-id=697 bgcolor=#d6d6d6
| 265697 ||  || — || October 26, 2005 || Kitt Peak || Spacewatch || KOR || align=right | 1.5 km || 
|-id=698 bgcolor=#E9E9E9
| 265698 ||  || — || October 26, 2005 || Kitt Peak || Spacewatch || — || align=right | 2.7 km || 
|-id=699 bgcolor=#E9E9E9
| 265699 ||  || — || October 26, 2005 || Kitt Peak || Spacewatch || — || align=right | 1.1 km || 
|-id=700 bgcolor=#E9E9E9
| 265700 ||  || — || October 26, 2005 || Palomar || NEAT || — || align=right | 3.8 km || 
|}

265701–265800 

|-bgcolor=#E9E9E9
| 265701 ||  || — || October 27, 2005 || Anderson Mesa || LONEOS || — || align=right | 2.6 km || 
|-id=702 bgcolor=#E9E9E9
| 265702 ||  || — || October 24, 2005 || Kitt Peak || Spacewatch || HEN || align=right | 1.2 km || 
|-id=703 bgcolor=#E9E9E9
| 265703 ||  || — || October 24, 2005 || Kitt Peak || Spacewatch || — || align=right | 2.3 km || 
|-id=704 bgcolor=#E9E9E9
| 265704 ||  || — || October 24, 2005 || Kitt Peak || Spacewatch || — || align=right | 2.2 km || 
|-id=705 bgcolor=#E9E9E9
| 265705 ||  || — || October 25, 2005 || Mount Lemmon || Mount Lemmon Survey || — || align=right | 1.5 km || 
|-id=706 bgcolor=#E9E9E9
| 265706 ||  || — || October 25, 2005 || Kitt Peak || Spacewatch || — || align=right | 1.6 km || 
|-id=707 bgcolor=#E9E9E9
| 265707 ||  || — || October 27, 2005 || Mount Lemmon || Mount Lemmon Survey || HEN || align=right | 1.1 km || 
|-id=708 bgcolor=#E9E9E9
| 265708 ||  || — || October 25, 2005 || Kitt Peak || Spacewatch || — || align=right | 1.1 km || 
|-id=709 bgcolor=#E9E9E9
| 265709 ||  || — || October 25, 2005 || Kitt Peak || Spacewatch || — || align=right | 2.3 km || 
|-id=710 bgcolor=#E9E9E9
| 265710 ||  || — || October 25, 2005 || Kitt Peak || Spacewatch || — || align=right | 1.6 km || 
|-id=711 bgcolor=#E9E9E9
| 265711 ||  || — || October 26, 2005 || Kitt Peak || Spacewatch || HNA || align=right | 2.6 km || 
|-id=712 bgcolor=#E9E9E9
| 265712 ||  || — || October 25, 2005 || Kitt Peak || Spacewatch || — || align=right | 1.6 km || 
|-id=713 bgcolor=#E9E9E9
| 265713 ||  || — || October 27, 2005 || Kitt Peak || Spacewatch || — || align=right | 1.7 km || 
|-id=714 bgcolor=#E9E9E9
| 265714 ||  || — || October 24, 2005 || Kitt Peak || Spacewatch || — || align=right | 1.7 km || 
|-id=715 bgcolor=#E9E9E9
| 265715 ||  || — || October 26, 2005 || Kitt Peak || Spacewatch || — || align=right | 1.7 km || 
|-id=716 bgcolor=#E9E9E9
| 265716 ||  || — || October 26, 2005 || Kitt Peak || Spacewatch || — || align=right | 1.6 km || 
|-id=717 bgcolor=#fefefe
| 265717 ||  || — || October 28, 2005 || Mount Lemmon || Mount Lemmon Survey || — || align=right data-sort-value="0.96" | 960 m || 
|-id=718 bgcolor=#d6d6d6
| 265718 ||  || — || October 29, 2005 || Catalina || CSS || — || align=right | 3.5 km || 
|-id=719 bgcolor=#fefefe
| 265719 ||  || — || October 24, 2005 || Kitt Peak || Spacewatch || V || align=right data-sort-value="0.87" | 870 m || 
|-id=720 bgcolor=#E9E9E9
| 265720 ||  || — || October 27, 2005 || Kitt Peak || Spacewatch || — || align=right | 1.5 km || 
|-id=721 bgcolor=#E9E9E9
| 265721 ||  || — || October 30, 2005 || Mount Lemmon || Mount Lemmon Survey || INO || align=right | 1.5 km || 
|-id=722 bgcolor=#E9E9E9
| 265722 ||  || — || October 27, 2005 || Catalina || CSS || ADE || align=right | 3.3 km || 
|-id=723 bgcolor=#E9E9E9
| 265723 ||  || — || October 28, 2005 || Catalina || CSS || — || align=right | 1.9 km || 
|-id=724 bgcolor=#E9E9E9
| 265724 ||  || — || October 31, 2005 || Mount Lemmon || Mount Lemmon Survey || — || align=right | 1.6 km || 
|-id=725 bgcolor=#E9E9E9
| 265725 ||  || — || October 31, 2005 || Mount Lemmon || Mount Lemmon Survey || — || align=right | 1.8 km || 
|-id=726 bgcolor=#d6d6d6
| 265726 ||  || — || October 31, 2005 || Catalina || CSS || EOS || align=right | 2.3 km || 
|-id=727 bgcolor=#E9E9E9
| 265727 ||  || — || October 25, 2005 || Kitt Peak || Spacewatch || — || align=right | 2.5 km || 
|-id=728 bgcolor=#E9E9E9
| 265728 ||  || — || October 25, 2005 || Mount Lemmon || Mount Lemmon Survey || — || align=right | 2.8 km || 
|-id=729 bgcolor=#E9E9E9
| 265729 ||  || — || October 28, 2005 || Kitt Peak || Spacewatch || HEN || align=right | 1.1 km || 
|-id=730 bgcolor=#E9E9E9
| 265730 ||  || — || October 28, 2005 || Kitt Peak || Spacewatch || — || align=right | 1.5 km || 
|-id=731 bgcolor=#E9E9E9
| 265731 ||  || — || October 31, 2005 || Anderson Mesa || LONEOS || — || align=right | 1.9 km || 
|-id=732 bgcolor=#E9E9E9
| 265732 ||  || — || October 29, 2005 || Catalina || CSS || — || align=right | 2.7 km || 
|-id=733 bgcolor=#E9E9E9
| 265733 ||  || — || October 28, 2005 || Socorro || LINEAR || — || align=right | 2.0 km || 
|-id=734 bgcolor=#E9E9E9
| 265734 ||  || — || October 23, 2005 || Catalina || CSS || EUN || align=right | 1.5 km || 
|-id=735 bgcolor=#E9E9E9
| 265735 ||  || — || October 22, 2005 || Palomar || NEAT || — || align=right | 1.2 km || 
|-id=736 bgcolor=#E9E9E9
| 265736 ||  || — || October 23, 2005 || Catalina || CSS || EUN || align=right | 1.4 km || 
|-id=737 bgcolor=#E9E9E9
| 265737 ||  || — || October 27, 2005 || Catalina || CSS || — || align=right | 1.7 km || 
|-id=738 bgcolor=#E9E9E9
| 265738 ||  || — || October 27, 2005 || Socorro || LINEAR || — || align=right | 2.2 km || 
|-id=739 bgcolor=#E9E9E9
| 265739 ||  || — || October 27, 2005 || Catalina || CSS || — || align=right | 2.9 km || 
|-id=740 bgcolor=#E9E9E9
| 265740 ||  || — || October 25, 2005 || Kitt Peak || Spacewatch || AGN || align=right | 1.4 km || 
|-id=741 bgcolor=#E9E9E9
| 265741 ||  || — || October 27, 2005 || Catalina || CSS || — || align=right | 1.7 km || 
|-id=742 bgcolor=#d6d6d6
| 265742 ||  || — || October 24, 2005 || Mauna Kea || D. J. Tholen || — || align=right | 2.7 km || 
|-id=743 bgcolor=#E9E9E9
| 265743 ||  || — || November 6, 2005 || Pla D'Arguines || Pla D'Arguines Obs. || MAR || align=right | 1.5 km || 
|-id=744 bgcolor=#E9E9E9
| 265744 ||  || — || November 6, 2005 || Mayhill || A. Lowe || — || align=right | 2.6 km || 
|-id=745 bgcolor=#E9E9E9
| 265745 ||  || — || November 3, 2005 || Kitt Peak || Spacewatch || — || align=right | 1.7 km || 
|-id=746 bgcolor=#d6d6d6
| 265746 ||  || — || November 11, 2005 || Cordell-Lorenz || Cordell–Lorenz Obs. || — || align=right | 2.7 km || 
|-id=747 bgcolor=#d6d6d6
| 265747 ||  || — || November 6, 2005 || Kitt Peak || Spacewatch || — || align=right | 4.2 km || 
|-id=748 bgcolor=#E9E9E9
| 265748 ||  || — || November 2, 2005 || Mount Lemmon || Mount Lemmon Survey || — || align=right | 1.3 km || 
|-id=749 bgcolor=#E9E9E9
| 265749 ||  || — || November 4, 2005 || Kitt Peak || Spacewatch || — || align=right | 1.7 km || 
|-id=750 bgcolor=#E9E9E9
| 265750 ||  || — || November 4, 2005 || Socorro || LINEAR || — || align=right | 2.0 km || 
|-id=751 bgcolor=#E9E9E9
| 265751 ||  || — || November 3, 2005 || Socorro || LINEAR || — || align=right | 3.2 km || 
|-id=752 bgcolor=#E9E9E9
| 265752 ||  || — || November 5, 2005 || Kitt Peak || Spacewatch || — || align=right | 2.4 km || 
|-id=753 bgcolor=#E9E9E9
| 265753 ||  || — || November 2, 2005 || Mount Lemmon || Mount Lemmon Survey || — || align=right | 2.0 km || 
|-id=754 bgcolor=#E9E9E9
| 265754 ||  || — || November 3, 2005 || Socorro || LINEAR || — || align=right | 1.7 km || 
|-id=755 bgcolor=#E9E9E9
| 265755 ||  || — || November 5, 2005 || Mount Lemmon || Mount Lemmon Survey || — || align=right | 1.5 km || 
|-id=756 bgcolor=#E9E9E9
| 265756 ||  || — || November 6, 2005 || Kitt Peak || Spacewatch || — || align=right | 2.9 km || 
|-id=757 bgcolor=#E9E9E9
| 265757 ||  || — || November 7, 2005 || Socorro || LINEAR || — || align=right | 2.0 km || 
|-id=758 bgcolor=#E9E9E9
| 265758 ||  || — || November 5, 2005 || Kitt Peak || Spacewatch || NEM || align=right | 3.6 km || 
|-id=759 bgcolor=#E9E9E9
| 265759 ||  || — || November 2, 2005 || Mount Lemmon || Mount Lemmon Survey || POS || align=right | 4.5 km || 
|-id=760 bgcolor=#E9E9E9
| 265760 ||  || — || November 6, 2005 || Mount Lemmon || Mount Lemmon Survey || — || align=right | 1.7 km || 
|-id=761 bgcolor=#E9E9E9
| 265761 ||  || — || November 3, 2005 || Mount Lemmon || Mount Lemmon Survey || — || align=right | 2.1 km || 
|-id=762 bgcolor=#E9E9E9
| 265762 ||  || — || November 20, 2005 || Palomar || NEAT || — || align=right | 2.4 km || 
|-id=763 bgcolor=#E9E9E9
| 265763 ||  || — || November 21, 2005 || Junk Bond || D. Healy || — || align=right | 2.0 km || 
|-id=764 bgcolor=#E9E9E9
| 265764 ||  || — || November 21, 2005 || Palomar || NEAT || — || align=right | 1.9 km || 
|-id=765 bgcolor=#E9E9E9
| 265765 ||  || — || November 21, 2005 || Kitt Peak || Spacewatch || — || align=right | 1.3 km || 
|-id=766 bgcolor=#E9E9E9
| 265766 ||  || — || November 21, 2005 || Kitt Peak || Spacewatch || — || align=right | 1.4 km || 
|-id=767 bgcolor=#E9E9E9
| 265767 ||  || — || November 21, 2005 || Kitt Peak || Spacewatch || — || align=right | 2.6 km || 
|-id=768 bgcolor=#E9E9E9
| 265768 ||  || — || November 21, 2005 || Kitt Peak || Spacewatch || HEN || align=right | 1.3 km || 
|-id=769 bgcolor=#E9E9E9
| 265769 ||  || — || November 21, 2005 || Kitt Peak || Spacewatch || — || align=right | 2.8 km || 
|-id=770 bgcolor=#E9E9E9
| 265770 ||  || — || November 21, 2005 || Kitt Peak || Spacewatch || — || align=right | 2.7 km || 
|-id=771 bgcolor=#E9E9E9
| 265771 ||  || — || November 22, 2005 || Kitt Peak || Spacewatch || NEM || align=right | 3.3 km || 
|-id=772 bgcolor=#E9E9E9
| 265772 ||  || — || November 22, 2005 || Kitt Peak || Spacewatch || PAD || align=right | 3.3 km || 
|-id=773 bgcolor=#E9E9E9
| 265773 ||  || — || November 25, 2005 || Kitt Peak || Spacewatch || NEM || align=right | 2.6 km || 
|-id=774 bgcolor=#E9E9E9
| 265774 ||  || — || November 25, 2005 || Catalina || CSS || — || align=right | 3.1 km || 
|-id=775 bgcolor=#E9E9E9
| 265775 ||  || — || November 25, 2005 || Catalina || CSS || — || align=right | 1.9 km || 
|-id=776 bgcolor=#E9E9E9
| 265776 ||  || — || November 22, 2005 || Kitt Peak || Spacewatch || — || align=right | 3.3 km || 
|-id=777 bgcolor=#E9E9E9
| 265777 ||  || — || November 27, 2005 || Anderson Mesa || LONEOS || MAR || align=right | 2.1 km || 
|-id=778 bgcolor=#E9E9E9
| 265778 ||  || — || November 26, 2005 || Kitt Peak || Spacewatch || AST || align=right | 2.2 km || 
|-id=779 bgcolor=#E9E9E9
| 265779 ||  || — || November 26, 2005 || Mount Lemmon || Mount Lemmon Survey || HEN || align=right | 1.3 km || 
|-id=780 bgcolor=#E9E9E9
| 265780 ||  || — || November 29, 2005 || Socorro || LINEAR || HEN || align=right | 1.2 km || 
|-id=781 bgcolor=#E9E9E9
| 265781 ||  || — || November 29, 2005 || Socorro || LINEAR || — || align=right | 3.0 km || 
|-id=782 bgcolor=#E9E9E9
| 265782 ||  || — || November 30, 2005 || Kitt Peak || Spacewatch || — || align=right | 2.6 km || 
|-id=783 bgcolor=#E9E9E9
| 265783 ||  || — || November 30, 2005 || Mount Lemmon || Mount Lemmon Survey || — || align=right | 3.2 km || 
|-id=784 bgcolor=#E9E9E9
| 265784 ||  || — || November 29, 2005 || Socorro || LINEAR || INO || align=right | 1.8 km || 
|-id=785 bgcolor=#E9E9E9
| 265785 ||  || — || November 30, 2005 || Kitt Peak || Spacewatch || — || align=right | 3.3 km || 
|-id=786 bgcolor=#E9E9E9
| 265786 ||  || — || November 30, 2005 || Mount Lemmon || Mount Lemmon Survey || — || align=right | 2.5 km || 
|-id=787 bgcolor=#E9E9E9
| 265787 ||  || — || November 25, 2005 || Mount Lemmon || Mount Lemmon Survey || — || align=right | 1.2 km || 
|-id=788 bgcolor=#E9E9E9
| 265788 ||  || — || November 30, 2005 || Palomar || NEAT || — || align=right | 3.2 km || 
|-id=789 bgcolor=#E9E9E9
| 265789 ||  || — || November 28, 2005 || Socorro || LINEAR || — || align=right | 3.0 km || 
|-id=790 bgcolor=#E9E9E9
| 265790 ||  || — || November 29, 2005 || Kitt Peak || Spacewatch || — || align=right | 2.5 km || 
|-id=791 bgcolor=#E9E9E9
| 265791 ||  || — || November 30, 2005 || Socorro || LINEAR || — || align=right | 1.2 km || 
|-id=792 bgcolor=#E9E9E9
| 265792 ||  || — || November 30, 2005 || Kitt Peak || Spacewatch || — || align=right | 2.2 km || 
|-id=793 bgcolor=#fefefe
| 265793 ||  || — || November 30, 2005 || Mount Lemmon || Mount Lemmon Survey || NYS || align=right | 1.1 km || 
|-id=794 bgcolor=#E9E9E9
| 265794 ||  || — || November 21, 2005 || Catalina || CSS || — || align=right | 2.6 km || 
|-id=795 bgcolor=#E9E9E9
| 265795 ||  || — || November 26, 2005 || Catalina || CSS || — || align=right | 2.2 km || 
|-id=796 bgcolor=#E9E9E9
| 265796 ||  || — || November 28, 2005 || Palomar || NEAT || MAR || align=right | 1.6 km || 
|-id=797 bgcolor=#E9E9E9
| 265797 ||  || — || November 29, 2005 || Catalina || CSS || EUN || align=right | 1.9 km || 
|-id=798 bgcolor=#d6d6d6
| 265798 ||  || — || November 30, 2005 || Kitt Peak || Spacewatch || — || align=right | 3.2 km || 
|-id=799 bgcolor=#d6d6d6
| 265799 ||  || — || November 30, 2005 || Socorro || LINEAR || — || align=right | 3.7 km || 
|-id=800 bgcolor=#E9E9E9
| 265800 ||  || — || November 28, 2005 || Kitt Peak || Spacewatch || — || align=right | 2.7 km || 
|}

265801–265900 

|-bgcolor=#E9E9E9
| 265801 ||  || — || December 1, 2005 || Palomar || NEAT || — || align=right | 2.7 km || 
|-id=802 bgcolor=#E9E9E9
| 265802 ||  || — || December 2, 2005 || Mount Lemmon || Mount Lemmon Survey || — || align=right | 2.7 km || 
|-id=803 bgcolor=#E9E9E9
| 265803 ||  || — || December 6, 2005 || Desert Moon || B. L. Stevens || MRX || align=right | 1.1 km || 
|-id=804 bgcolor=#E9E9E9
| 265804 ||  || — || December 2, 2005 || Kitt Peak || Spacewatch || — || align=right | 1.3 km || 
|-id=805 bgcolor=#E9E9E9
| 265805 ||  || — || December 1, 2005 || Kitt Peak || Spacewatch || — || align=right | 3.2 km || 
|-id=806 bgcolor=#d6d6d6
| 265806 ||  || — || December 2, 2005 || Mount Lemmon || Mount Lemmon Survey || — || align=right | 2.9 km || 
|-id=807 bgcolor=#E9E9E9
| 265807 ||  || — || December 4, 2005 || Kitt Peak || Spacewatch || — || align=right | 4.1 km || 
|-id=808 bgcolor=#E9E9E9
| 265808 ||  || — || December 4, 2005 || Kitt Peak || Spacewatch || — || align=right | 2.7 km || 
|-id=809 bgcolor=#d6d6d6
| 265809 ||  || — || December 4, 2005 || Kitt Peak || Spacewatch || — || align=right | 3.6 km || 
|-id=810 bgcolor=#d6d6d6
| 265810 ||  || — || December 4, 2005 || Kitt Peak || Spacewatch || — || align=right | 5.5 km || 
|-id=811 bgcolor=#d6d6d6
| 265811 ||  || — || December 4, 2005 || Kitt Peak || Spacewatch || — || align=right | 4.4 km || 
|-id=812 bgcolor=#E9E9E9
| 265812 ||  || — || December 5, 2005 || Mount Lemmon || Mount Lemmon Survey || — || align=right | 2.2 km || 
|-id=813 bgcolor=#E9E9E9
| 265813 ||  || — || December 2, 2005 || Kitt Peak || Spacewatch || HNA || align=right | 2.4 km || 
|-id=814 bgcolor=#E9E9E9
| 265814 ||  || — || December 3, 2005 || Kitt Peak || Spacewatch || — || align=right | 2.4 km || 
|-id=815 bgcolor=#E9E9E9
| 265815 ||  || — || December 3, 2005 || Kitt Peak || Spacewatch || — || align=right | 2.8 km || 
|-id=816 bgcolor=#E9E9E9
| 265816 ||  || — || December 7, 2005 || Socorro || LINEAR || — || align=right | 3.2 km || 
|-id=817 bgcolor=#E9E9E9
| 265817 ||  || — || December 5, 2005 || Kitt Peak || Spacewatch || PAD || align=right | 3.2 km || 
|-id=818 bgcolor=#d6d6d6
| 265818 ||  || — || December 5, 2005 || Mount Lemmon || Mount Lemmon Survey || — || align=right | 3.3 km || 
|-id=819 bgcolor=#E9E9E9
| 265819 ||  || — || December 6, 2005 || Kitt Peak || Spacewatch || NEM || align=right | 2.2 km || 
|-id=820 bgcolor=#d6d6d6
| 265820 ||  || — || December 6, 2005 || Kitt Peak || Spacewatch || CHA || align=right | 2.4 km || 
|-id=821 bgcolor=#d6d6d6
| 265821 ||  || — || December 1, 2005 || Kitt Peak || M. W. Buie || — || align=right | 4.5 km || 
|-id=822 bgcolor=#E9E9E9
| 265822 ||  || — || December 18, 2005 || Marly || P. Kocher || — || align=right | 2.4 km || 
|-id=823 bgcolor=#E9E9E9
| 265823 ||  || — || December 21, 2005 || Catalina || CSS || — || align=right | 3.8 km || 
|-id=824 bgcolor=#E9E9E9
| 265824 ||  || — || December 21, 2005 || Kitt Peak || Spacewatch || — || align=right | 2.3 km || 
|-id=825 bgcolor=#E9E9E9
| 265825 ||  || — || December 21, 2005 || Catalina || CSS || WIT || align=right | 1.5 km || 
|-id=826 bgcolor=#E9E9E9
| 265826 ||  || — || December 21, 2005 || Kitt Peak || Spacewatch || — || align=right | 1.3 km || 
|-id=827 bgcolor=#d6d6d6
| 265827 ||  || — || December 21, 2005 || Kitt Peak || Spacewatch || KOR || align=right | 1.8 km || 
|-id=828 bgcolor=#d6d6d6
| 265828 ||  || — || December 24, 2005 || Kitt Peak || Spacewatch || KOR || align=right | 1.8 km || 
|-id=829 bgcolor=#d6d6d6
| 265829 ||  || — || December 24, 2005 || Kitt Peak || Spacewatch || KOR || align=right | 1.6 km || 
|-id=830 bgcolor=#d6d6d6
| 265830 ||  || — || December 24, 2005 || Kitt Peak || Spacewatch || KOR || align=right | 1.5 km || 
|-id=831 bgcolor=#d6d6d6
| 265831 ||  || — || December 24, 2005 || Kitt Peak || Spacewatch || KOR || align=right | 1.9 km || 
|-id=832 bgcolor=#d6d6d6
| 265832 ||  || — || December 24, 2005 || Kitt Peak || Spacewatch || — || align=right | 3.1 km || 
|-id=833 bgcolor=#d6d6d6
| 265833 ||  || — || December 24, 2005 || Kitt Peak || Spacewatch || — || align=right | 3.7 km || 
|-id=834 bgcolor=#d6d6d6
| 265834 ||  || — || December 22, 2005 || Kitt Peak || Spacewatch || — || align=right | 3.4 km || 
|-id=835 bgcolor=#d6d6d6
| 265835 ||  || — || December 25, 2005 || Kitt Peak || Spacewatch || — || align=right | 3.6 km || 
|-id=836 bgcolor=#d6d6d6
| 265836 ||  || — || December 25, 2005 || Kitt Peak || Spacewatch || KOR || align=right | 1.9 km || 
|-id=837 bgcolor=#d6d6d6
| 265837 ||  || — || December 22, 2005 || Kitt Peak || Spacewatch || — || align=right | 3.5 km || 
|-id=838 bgcolor=#E9E9E9
| 265838 ||  || — || December 21, 2005 || Kitt Peak || Spacewatch || AGN || align=right | 1.4 km || 
|-id=839 bgcolor=#E9E9E9
| 265839 ||  || — || December 24, 2005 || Kitt Peak || Spacewatch || WIT || align=right | 1.5 km || 
|-id=840 bgcolor=#E9E9E9
| 265840 ||  || — || December 24, 2005 || Kitt Peak || Spacewatch || AGN || align=right | 1.7 km || 
|-id=841 bgcolor=#E9E9E9
| 265841 ||  || — || December 25, 2005 || Kitt Peak || Spacewatch || HEN || align=right | 1.6 km || 
|-id=842 bgcolor=#d6d6d6
| 265842 ||  || — || December 25, 2005 || Kitt Peak || Spacewatch || — || align=right | 3.2 km || 
|-id=843 bgcolor=#E9E9E9
| 265843 ||  || — || December 24, 2005 || Kitt Peak || Spacewatch || GEF || align=right | 1.4 km || 
|-id=844 bgcolor=#d6d6d6
| 265844 ||  || — || December 24, 2005 || Kitt Peak || Spacewatch || EOS || align=right | 2.5 km || 
|-id=845 bgcolor=#d6d6d6
| 265845 ||  || — || December 24, 2005 || Kitt Peak || Spacewatch || KOR || align=right | 1.8 km || 
|-id=846 bgcolor=#d6d6d6
| 265846 ||  || — || December 24, 2005 || Kitt Peak || Spacewatch || — || align=right | 3.7 km || 
|-id=847 bgcolor=#d6d6d6
| 265847 ||  || — || December 24, 2005 || Kitt Peak || Spacewatch || KOR || align=right | 1.7 km || 
|-id=848 bgcolor=#d6d6d6
| 265848 ||  || — || December 24, 2005 || Kitt Peak || Spacewatch || KOR || align=right | 1.7 km || 
|-id=849 bgcolor=#E9E9E9
| 265849 ||  || — || December 26, 2005 || Mount Lemmon || Mount Lemmon Survey || — || align=right | 2.6 km || 
|-id=850 bgcolor=#d6d6d6
| 265850 ||  || — || December 27, 2005 || Mount Lemmon || Mount Lemmon Survey || ANF || align=right | 1.5 km || 
|-id=851 bgcolor=#E9E9E9
| 265851 ||  || — || December 25, 2005 || Kitt Peak || Spacewatch || WIT || align=right | 1.6 km || 
|-id=852 bgcolor=#d6d6d6
| 265852 ||  || — || December 25, 2005 || Kitt Peak || Spacewatch || — || align=right | 5.0 km || 
|-id=853 bgcolor=#E9E9E9
| 265853 ||  || — || December 27, 2005 || Mount Lemmon || Mount Lemmon Survey || HOF || align=right | 3.3 km || 
|-id=854 bgcolor=#E9E9E9
| 265854 ||  || — || December 25, 2005 || Mount Lemmon || Mount Lemmon Survey || — || align=right | 2.8 km || 
|-id=855 bgcolor=#d6d6d6
| 265855 ||  || — || December 28, 2005 || Mount Lemmon || Mount Lemmon Survey || KOR || align=right | 1.4 km || 
|-id=856 bgcolor=#E9E9E9
| 265856 ||  || — || December 25, 2005 || Kitt Peak || Spacewatch || WIT || align=right | 1.4 km || 
|-id=857 bgcolor=#d6d6d6
| 265857 ||  || — || December 25, 2005 || Kitt Peak || Spacewatch || — || align=right | 2.9 km || 
|-id=858 bgcolor=#E9E9E9
| 265858 ||  || — || December 27, 2005 || Kitt Peak || Spacewatch || — || align=right | 2.2 km || 
|-id=859 bgcolor=#E9E9E9
| 265859 ||  || — || December 27, 2005 || Kitt Peak || Spacewatch || — || align=right | 3.5 km || 
|-id=860 bgcolor=#E9E9E9
| 265860 ||  || — || December 27, 2005 || Kitt Peak || Spacewatch || AGN || align=right | 1.6 km || 
|-id=861 bgcolor=#E9E9E9
| 265861 ||  || — || December 27, 2005 || Socorro || LINEAR || — || align=right | 4.1 km || 
|-id=862 bgcolor=#d6d6d6
| 265862 ||  || — || December 27, 2005 || Mount Lemmon || Mount Lemmon Survey || KAR || align=right | 1.3 km || 
|-id=863 bgcolor=#d6d6d6
| 265863 ||  || — || December 27, 2005 || Mount Lemmon || Mount Lemmon Survey || — || align=right | 5.2 km || 
|-id=864 bgcolor=#E9E9E9
| 265864 ||  || — || December 29, 2005 || Kitt Peak || Spacewatch || — || align=right | 3.5 km || 
|-id=865 bgcolor=#E9E9E9
| 265865 ||  || — || December 29, 2005 || Kitt Peak || Spacewatch || WIT || align=right | 1.4 km || 
|-id=866 bgcolor=#d6d6d6
| 265866 ||  || — || December 29, 2005 || Palomar || NEAT || TRP || align=right | 3.3 km || 
|-id=867 bgcolor=#d6d6d6
| 265867 ||  || — || December 26, 2005 || Mount Lemmon || Mount Lemmon Survey || KOR || align=right | 1.8 km || 
|-id=868 bgcolor=#fefefe
| 265868 ||  || — || December 29, 2005 || Catalina || CSS || H || align=right data-sort-value="0.92" | 920 m || 
|-id=869 bgcolor=#E9E9E9
| 265869 ||  || — || December 25, 2005 || Kitt Peak || Spacewatch || — || align=right | 2.4 km || 
|-id=870 bgcolor=#E9E9E9
| 265870 ||  || — || December 25, 2005 || Kitt Peak || Spacewatch || HNA || align=right | 3.3 km || 
|-id=871 bgcolor=#E9E9E9
| 265871 ||  || — || December 24, 2005 || Kitt Peak || Spacewatch || — || align=right | 1.9 km || 
|-id=872 bgcolor=#d6d6d6
| 265872 ||  || — || December 24, 2005 || Kitt Peak || Spacewatch || KOR || align=right | 1.4 km || 
|-id=873 bgcolor=#d6d6d6
| 265873 ||  || — || December 25, 2005 || Kitt Peak || Spacewatch || ALA || align=right | 5.2 km || 
|-id=874 bgcolor=#E9E9E9
| 265874 ||  || — || December 28, 2005 || Mount Lemmon || Mount Lemmon Survey || HEN || align=right | 1.6 km || 
|-id=875 bgcolor=#E9E9E9
| 265875 ||  || — || December 24, 2005 || Kitt Peak || Spacewatch || — || align=right | 1.9 km || 
|-id=876 bgcolor=#E9E9E9
| 265876 ||  || — || December 26, 2005 || Mount Lemmon || Mount Lemmon Survey || — || align=right | 2.8 km || 
|-id=877 bgcolor=#d6d6d6
| 265877 ||  || — || December 26, 2005 || Mount Lemmon || Mount Lemmon Survey || — || align=right | 2.5 km || 
|-id=878 bgcolor=#d6d6d6
| 265878 ||  || — || December 26, 2005 || Mount Lemmon || Mount Lemmon Survey || KOR || align=right | 1.8 km || 
|-id=879 bgcolor=#fefefe
| 265879 ||  || — || January 5, 2006 || Catalina || CSS || H || align=right | 1.2 km || 
|-id=880 bgcolor=#E9E9E9
| 265880 ||  || — || January 5, 2006 || Catalina || CSS || GAL || align=right | 1.8 km || 
|-id=881 bgcolor=#E9E9E9
| 265881 ||  || — || January 7, 2006 || Anderson Mesa || LONEOS || — || align=right | 3.7 km || 
|-id=882 bgcolor=#fefefe
| 265882 ||  || — || January 7, 2006 || Anderson Mesa || LONEOS || H || align=right | 1.1 km || 
|-id=883 bgcolor=#d6d6d6
| 265883 ||  || — || January 4, 2006 || Kitt Peak || Spacewatch || — || align=right | 2.9 km || 
|-id=884 bgcolor=#d6d6d6
| 265884 ||  || — || January 4, 2006 || Kitt Peak || Spacewatch || — || align=right | 2.5 km || 
|-id=885 bgcolor=#E9E9E9
| 265885 ||  || — || January 5, 2006 || Kitt Peak || Spacewatch || AGN || align=right | 1.9 km || 
|-id=886 bgcolor=#d6d6d6
| 265886 ||  || — || January 6, 2006 || Anderson Mesa || LONEOS || — || align=right | 4.7 km || 
|-id=887 bgcolor=#E9E9E9
| 265887 ||  || — || January 2, 2006 || Catalina || CSS || — || align=right | 3.3 km || 
|-id=888 bgcolor=#d6d6d6
| 265888 ||  || — || January 5, 2006 || Kitt Peak || Spacewatch || — || align=right | 2.5 km || 
|-id=889 bgcolor=#E9E9E9
| 265889 ||  || — || January 8, 2006 || Mount Lemmon || Mount Lemmon Survey || — || align=right | 3.6 km || 
|-id=890 bgcolor=#d6d6d6
| 265890 ||  || — || January 5, 2006 || Kitt Peak || Spacewatch || NAE || align=right | 4.2 km || 
|-id=891 bgcolor=#d6d6d6
| 265891 ||  || — || January 6, 2006 || Kitt Peak || Spacewatch || — || align=right | 3.4 km || 
|-id=892 bgcolor=#E9E9E9
| 265892 ||  || — || January 6, 2006 || Kitt Peak || Spacewatch || GEF || align=right | 1.8 km || 
|-id=893 bgcolor=#d6d6d6
| 265893 ||  || — || January 8, 2006 || Kitt Peak || Spacewatch || KOR || align=right | 1.6 km || 
|-id=894 bgcolor=#E9E9E9
| 265894 ||  || — || January 2, 2006 || Mount Lemmon || Mount Lemmon Survey || AGN || align=right | 1.7 km || 
|-id=895 bgcolor=#E9E9E9
| 265895 ||  || — || January 8, 2006 || Mount Lemmon || Mount Lemmon Survey || — || align=right | 3.7 km || 
|-id=896 bgcolor=#d6d6d6
| 265896 ||  || — || January 7, 2006 || Mount Lemmon || Mount Lemmon Survey || — || align=right | 3.9 km || 
|-id=897 bgcolor=#d6d6d6
| 265897 ||  || — || January 23, 2006 || Nyukasa || Mount Nyukasa Stn. || — || align=right | 3.1 km || 
|-id=898 bgcolor=#d6d6d6
| 265898 ||  || — || January 23, 2006 || Nyukasa || Mount Nyukasa Stn. || — || align=right | 3.1 km || 
|-id=899 bgcolor=#d6d6d6
| 265899 ||  || — || January 21, 2006 || Kitt Peak || Spacewatch || — || align=right | 3.4 km || 
|-id=900 bgcolor=#fefefe
| 265900 ||  || — || January 22, 2006 || Mount Lemmon || Mount Lemmon Survey || — || align=right | 1.8 km || 
|}

265901–266000 

|-bgcolor=#d6d6d6
| 265901 ||  || — || January 23, 2006 || Kitt Peak || Spacewatch || — || align=right | 3.3 km || 
|-id=902 bgcolor=#d6d6d6
| 265902 ||  || — || January 23, 2006 || Mount Lemmon || Mount Lemmon Survey || — || align=right | 4.0 km || 
|-id=903 bgcolor=#d6d6d6
| 265903 ||  || — || January 23, 2006 || Kitt Peak || Spacewatch || TEL || align=right | 2.3 km || 
|-id=904 bgcolor=#d6d6d6
| 265904 ||  || — || January 23, 2006 || Kitt Peak || Spacewatch || K-2 || align=right | 1.7 km || 
|-id=905 bgcolor=#d6d6d6
| 265905 ||  || — || January 23, 2006 || Kitt Peak || Spacewatch || K-2 || align=right | 1.8 km || 
|-id=906 bgcolor=#d6d6d6
| 265906 ||  || — || January 23, 2006 || Kitt Peak || Spacewatch || — || align=right | 3.9 km || 
|-id=907 bgcolor=#d6d6d6
| 265907 ||  || — || January 23, 2006 || Kitt Peak || Spacewatch || — || align=right | 3.4 km || 
|-id=908 bgcolor=#d6d6d6
| 265908 ||  || — || January 23, 2006 || Kitt Peak || Spacewatch || — || align=right | 4.8 km || 
|-id=909 bgcolor=#d6d6d6
| 265909 ||  || — || January 23, 2006 || Kitt Peak || Spacewatch || EOS || align=right | 2.9 km || 
|-id=910 bgcolor=#d6d6d6
| 265910 ||  || — || January 23, 2006 || Kitt Peak || Spacewatch || EOS || align=right | 2.6 km || 
|-id=911 bgcolor=#d6d6d6
| 265911 ||  || — || January 23, 2006 || Mount Lemmon || Mount Lemmon Survey || — || align=right | 3.3 km || 
|-id=912 bgcolor=#d6d6d6
| 265912 ||  || — || January 25, 2006 || Kitt Peak || Spacewatch || — || align=right | 3.1 km || 
|-id=913 bgcolor=#d6d6d6
| 265913 ||  || — || January 25, 2006 || Kitt Peak || Spacewatch || — || align=right | 2.7 km || 
|-id=914 bgcolor=#d6d6d6
| 265914 ||  || — || January 25, 2006 || Kitt Peak || Spacewatch || — || align=right | 3.8 km || 
|-id=915 bgcolor=#d6d6d6
| 265915 ||  || — || January 26, 2006 || Kitt Peak || Spacewatch || THM || align=right | 2.2 km || 
|-id=916 bgcolor=#d6d6d6
| 265916 ||  || — || January 26, 2006 || Kitt Peak || Spacewatch || — || align=right | 3.4 km || 
|-id=917 bgcolor=#d6d6d6
| 265917 ||  || — || January 26, 2006 || Kitt Peak || Spacewatch || KOR || align=right | 1.7 km || 
|-id=918 bgcolor=#d6d6d6
| 265918 ||  || — || January 25, 2006 || Kitt Peak || Spacewatch || EMA || align=right | 5.7 km || 
|-id=919 bgcolor=#d6d6d6
| 265919 ||  || — || January 25, 2006 || Kitt Peak || Spacewatch || KAR || align=right | 1.4 km || 
|-id=920 bgcolor=#d6d6d6
| 265920 ||  || — || January 26, 2006 || Kitt Peak || Spacewatch || HYG || align=right | 3.8 km || 
|-id=921 bgcolor=#d6d6d6
| 265921 ||  || — || January 26, 2006 || Kitt Peak || Spacewatch || — || align=right | 2.5 km || 
|-id=922 bgcolor=#d6d6d6
| 265922 ||  || — || January 26, 2006 || Kitt Peak || Spacewatch || HYG || align=right | 3.5 km || 
|-id=923 bgcolor=#d6d6d6
| 265923 ||  || — || January 27, 2006 || Mount Lemmon || Mount Lemmon Survey || KOR || align=right | 1.6 km || 
|-id=924 bgcolor=#d6d6d6
| 265924 Franceclemente ||  ||  || January 21, 2006 || Vallemare di Borbona || V. S. Casulli || KOR || align=right | 1.7 km || 
|-id=925 bgcolor=#d6d6d6
| 265925 ||  || — || January 25, 2006 || Kitt Peak || Spacewatch || KOR || align=right | 1.6 km || 
|-id=926 bgcolor=#d6d6d6
| 265926 ||  || — || January 25, 2006 || Kitt Peak || Spacewatch || — || align=right | 3.8 km || 
|-id=927 bgcolor=#d6d6d6
| 265927 ||  || — || January 25, 2006 || Kitt Peak || Spacewatch || TRP || align=right | 3.0 km || 
|-id=928 bgcolor=#d6d6d6
| 265928 ||  || — || January 25, 2006 || Kitt Peak || Spacewatch || — || align=right | 5.1 km || 
|-id=929 bgcolor=#d6d6d6
| 265929 ||  || — || January 25, 2006 || Kitt Peak || Spacewatch || THM || align=right | 2.8 km || 
|-id=930 bgcolor=#d6d6d6
| 265930 ||  || — || January 25, 2006 || Kitt Peak || Spacewatch || THM || align=right | 2.9 km || 
|-id=931 bgcolor=#d6d6d6
| 265931 ||  || — || January 25, 2006 || Kitt Peak || Spacewatch || — || align=right | 2.6 km || 
|-id=932 bgcolor=#d6d6d6
| 265932 ||  || — || January 26, 2006 || Kitt Peak || Spacewatch || — || align=right | 3.6 km || 
|-id=933 bgcolor=#fefefe
| 265933 ||  || — || January 26, 2006 || Kitt Peak || Spacewatch || NYS || align=right data-sort-value="0.63" | 630 m || 
|-id=934 bgcolor=#d6d6d6
| 265934 ||  || — || January 26, 2006 || Mount Lemmon || Mount Lemmon Survey || — || align=right | 3.3 km || 
|-id=935 bgcolor=#d6d6d6
| 265935 ||  || — || January 26, 2006 || Mount Lemmon || Mount Lemmon Survey || THM || align=right | 3.5 km || 
|-id=936 bgcolor=#d6d6d6
| 265936 ||  || — || January 27, 2006 || Mount Lemmon || Mount Lemmon Survey || TEL || align=right | 2.0 km || 
|-id=937 bgcolor=#d6d6d6
| 265937 ||  || — || January 27, 2006 || Mount Lemmon || Mount Lemmon Survey || — || align=right | 4.1 km || 
|-id=938 bgcolor=#d6d6d6
| 265938 ||  || — || January 27, 2006 || Kitt Peak || Spacewatch || — || align=right | 2.5 km || 
|-id=939 bgcolor=#d6d6d6
| 265939 ||  || — || January 28, 2006 || Kitt Peak || Spacewatch || — || align=right | 4.3 km || 
|-id=940 bgcolor=#d6d6d6
| 265940 ||  || — || January 28, 2006 || Kitt Peak || Spacewatch || — || align=right | 5.5 km || 
|-id=941 bgcolor=#d6d6d6
| 265941 ||  || — || January 30, 2006 || Kitt Peak || Spacewatch || — || align=right | 3.8 km || 
|-id=942 bgcolor=#d6d6d6
| 265942 ||  || — || January 31, 2006 || Kitt Peak || Spacewatch || — || align=right | 3.1 km || 
|-id=943 bgcolor=#E9E9E9
| 265943 ||  || — || January 31, 2006 || Catalina || CSS || — || align=right | 2.3 km || 
|-id=944 bgcolor=#d6d6d6
| 265944 ||  || — || January 31, 2006 || Catalina || CSS || — || align=right | 3.5 km || 
|-id=945 bgcolor=#d6d6d6
| 265945 ||  || — || January 31, 2006 || Kitt Peak || Spacewatch || — || align=right | 2.8 km || 
|-id=946 bgcolor=#d6d6d6
| 265946 ||  || — || January 30, 2006 || Bergisch Gladbac || W. Bickel || — || align=right | 3.1 km || 
|-id=947 bgcolor=#d6d6d6
| 265947 ||  || — || January 30, 2006 || Kitt Peak || Spacewatch || — || align=right | 3.0 km || 
|-id=948 bgcolor=#d6d6d6
| 265948 ||  || — || January 30, 2006 || Kitt Peak || Spacewatch || — || align=right | 2.6 km || 
|-id=949 bgcolor=#E9E9E9
| 265949 ||  || — || January 31, 2006 || Kitt Peak || Spacewatch || AGN || align=right | 1.7 km || 
|-id=950 bgcolor=#d6d6d6
| 265950 ||  || — || January 31, 2006 || Kitt Peak || Spacewatch || — || align=right | 2.6 km || 
|-id=951 bgcolor=#d6d6d6
| 265951 ||  || — || January 31, 2006 || Kitt Peak || Spacewatch || — || align=right | 2.4 km || 
|-id=952 bgcolor=#d6d6d6
| 265952 ||  || — || January 31, 2006 || Kitt Peak || Spacewatch || — || align=right | 3.1 km || 
|-id=953 bgcolor=#d6d6d6
| 265953 ||  || — || January 31, 2006 || Kitt Peak || Spacewatch || — || align=right | 2.7 km || 
|-id=954 bgcolor=#d6d6d6
| 265954 ||  || — || January 31, 2006 || Kitt Peak || Spacewatch || HYG || align=right | 3.4 km || 
|-id=955 bgcolor=#d6d6d6
| 265955 ||  || — || January 31, 2006 || Kitt Peak || Spacewatch || — || align=right | 3.1 km || 
|-id=956 bgcolor=#d6d6d6
| 265956 ||  || — || January 31, 2006 || Kitt Peak || Spacewatch || — || align=right | 3.9 km || 
|-id=957 bgcolor=#d6d6d6
| 265957 ||  || — || January 31, 2006 || Kitt Peak || Spacewatch || — || align=right | 4.5 km || 
|-id=958 bgcolor=#d6d6d6
| 265958 ||  || — || January 25, 2006 || Anderson Mesa || LONEOS || — || align=right | 3.7 km || 
|-id=959 bgcolor=#d6d6d6
| 265959 ||  || — || January 31, 2006 || Catalina || CSS || — || align=right | 3.6 km || 
|-id=960 bgcolor=#d6d6d6
| 265960 ||  || — || January 23, 2006 || Kitt Peak || Spacewatch || — || align=right | 3.7 km || 
|-id=961 bgcolor=#d6d6d6
| 265961 ||  || — || January 23, 2006 || Kitt Peak || Spacewatch || THM || align=right | 3.1 km || 
|-id=962 bgcolor=#FFC2E0
| 265962 ||  || — || February 1, 2006 || Mount Lemmon || Mount Lemmon Survey || AMO || align=right data-sort-value="0.56" | 560 m || 
|-id=963 bgcolor=#d6d6d6
| 265963 ||  || — || February 4, 2006 || Kitt Peak || Spacewatch || — || align=right | 3.1 km || 
|-id=964 bgcolor=#d6d6d6
| 265964 ||  || — || February 6, 2006 || Mount Lemmon || Mount Lemmon Survey || THM || align=right | 2.5 km || 
|-id=965 bgcolor=#d6d6d6
| 265965 ||  || — || February 2, 2006 || Anderson Mesa || LONEOS || CRO || align=right | 4.6 km || 
|-id=966 bgcolor=#d6d6d6
| 265966 ||  || — || February 5, 2006 || Mount Lemmon || Mount Lemmon Survey || KOR || align=right | 1.7 km || 
|-id=967 bgcolor=#d6d6d6
| 265967 ||  || — || February 4, 2006 || Kitt Peak || Spacewatch || HYG || align=right | 3.7 km || 
|-id=968 bgcolor=#d6d6d6
| 265968 ||  || — || February 20, 2006 || Kitt Peak || Spacewatch || — || align=right | 3.0 km || 
|-id=969 bgcolor=#d6d6d6
| 265969 ||  || — || February 21, 2006 || Catalina || CSS || — || align=right | 4.0 km || 
|-id=970 bgcolor=#d6d6d6
| 265970 ||  || — || February 20, 2006 || Mount Lemmon || Mount Lemmon Survey || THM || align=right | 2.9 km || 
|-id=971 bgcolor=#d6d6d6
| 265971 ||  || — || February 20, 2006 || Kitt Peak || Spacewatch || — || align=right | 3.7 km || 
|-id=972 bgcolor=#d6d6d6
| 265972 ||  || — || February 20, 2006 || Kitt Peak || Spacewatch || — || align=right | 3.5 km || 
|-id=973 bgcolor=#d6d6d6
| 265973 ||  || — || February 20, 2006 || Kitt Peak || Spacewatch || — || align=right | 3.9 km || 
|-id=974 bgcolor=#d6d6d6
| 265974 ||  || — || February 20, 2006 || Kitt Peak || Spacewatch || — || align=right | 3.4 km || 
|-id=975 bgcolor=#d6d6d6
| 265975 ||  || — || February 20, 2006 || Kitt Peak || Spacewatch || — || align=right | 3.2 km || 
|-id=976 bgcolor=#d6d6d6
| 265976 ||  || — || February 20, 2006 || Kitt Peak || Spacewatch || — || align=right | 3.7 km || 
|-id=977 bgcolor=#d6d6d6
| 265977 ||  || — || February 20, 2006 || Kitt Peak || Spacewatch || THM || align=right | 2.6 km || 
|-id=978 bgcolor=#d6d6d6
| 265978 ||  || — || February 20, 2006 || Mount Lemmon || Mount Lemmon Survey || — || align=right | 3.6 km || 
|-id=979 bgcolor=#d6d6d6
| 265979 ||  || — || February 20, 2006 || Mount Lemmon || Mount Lemmon Survey || VER || align=right | 3.1 km || 
|-id=980 bgcolor=#d6d6d6
| 265980 ||  || — || February 20, 2006 || Mount Lemmon || Mount Lemmon Survey || — || align=right | 3.4 km || 
|-id=981 bgcolor=#d6d6d6
| 265981 ||  || — || February 20, 2006 || Kitt Peak || Spacewatch || THM || align=right | 4.0 km || 
|-id=982 bgcolor=#d6d6d6
| 265982 ||  || — || February 20, 2006 || Mount Lemmon || Mount Lemmon Survey || — || align=right | 3.7 km || 
|-id=983 bgcolor=#d6d6d6
| 265983 ||  || — || February 22, 2006 || Anderson Mesa || LONEOS || — || align=right | 4.1 km || 
|-id=984 bgcolor=#d6d6d6
| 265984 ||  || — || February 24, 2006 || Mount Lemmon || Mount Lemmon Survey || — || align=right | 2.9 km || 
|-id=985 bgcolor=#d6d6d6
| 265985 ||  || — || February 22, 2006 || Catalina || CSS || — || align=right | 3.5 km || 
|-id=986 bgcolor=#d6d6d6
| 265986 ||  || — || February 21, 2006 || Mount Lemmon || Mount Lemmon Survey || THM || align=right | 2.5 km || 
|-id=987 bgcolor=#d6d6d6
| 265987 ||  || — || February 24, 2006 || Kitt Peak || Spacewatch || HYG || align=right | 3.1 km || 
|-id=988 bgcolor=#d6d6d6
| 265988 ||  || — || February 24, 2006 || Kitt Peak || Spacewatch || — || align=right | 3.2 km || 
|-id=989 bgcolor=#d6d6d6
| 265989 ||  || — || February 24, 2006 || Kitt Peak || Spacewatch || — || align=right | 3.6 km || 
|-id=990 bgcolor=#d6d6d6
| 265990 ||  || — || February 24, 2006 || Kitt Peak || Spacewatch || — || align=right | 2.8 km || 
|-id=991 bgcolor=#d6d6d6
| 265991 ||  || — || February 24, 2006 || Kitt Peak || Spacewatch || THM || align=right | 2.3 km || 
|-id=992 bgcolor=#d6d6d6
| 265992 ||  || — || February 24, 2006 || Kitt Peak || Spacewatch || — || align=right | 4.1 km || 
|-id=993 bgcolor=#d6d6d6
| 265993 ||  || — || February 24, 2006 || Mount Lemmon || Mount Lemmon Survey || URS || align=right | 4.5 km || 
|-id=994 bgcolor=#d6d6d6
| 265994 ||  || — || February 25, 2006 || Mount Lemmon || Mount Lemmon Survey || HYG || align=right | 4.6 km || 
|-id=995 bgcolor=#d6d6d6
| 265995 ||  || — || February 25, 2006 || Mount Lemmon || Mount Lemmon Survey || THM || align=right | 2.3 km || 
|-id=996 bgcolor=#d6d6d6
| 265996 ||  || — || February 25, 2006 || Mount Lemmon || Mount Lemmon Survey || — || align=right | 2.7 km || 
|-id=997 bgcolor=#d6d6d6
| 265997 ||  || — || February 25, 2006 || Kitt Peak || Spacewatch || — || align=right | 3.5 km || 
|-id=998 bgcolor=#d6d6d6
| 265998 ||  || — || February 25, 2006 || Mount Lemmon || Mount Lemmon Survey || — || align=right | 4.6 km || 
|-id=999 bgcolor=#d6d6d6
| 265999 ||  || — || February 27, 2006 || Mount Lemmon || Mount Lemmon Survey || HYG || align=right | 3.7 km || 
|-id=000 bgcolor=#d6d6d6
| 266000 ||  || — || February 25, 2006 || Kitt Peak || Spacewatch || — || align=right | 3.7 km || 
|}

References

External links 
 Discovery Circumstances: Numbered Minor Planets (265001)–(270000) (IAU Minor Planet Center)

0265